

501001–501100 

|-bgcolor=#E9E9E9
| 501001 ||  || — || September 3, 2013 || Catalina || CSS ||  || align=right data-sort-value="0.80" | 800 m || 
|-id=002 bgcolor=#E9E9E9
| 501002 ||  || — || September 4, 2013 || Mount Lemmon || Mount Lemmon Survey ||  || align=right | 2.0 km || 
|-id=003 bgcolor=#d6d6d6
| 501003 ||  || — || September 4, 2013 || Mount Lemmon || Mount Lemmon Survey || KOR || align=right | 1.8 km || 
|-id=004 bgcolor=#E9E9E9
| 501004 ||  || — || September 4, 2013 || Mount Lemmon || Mount Lemmon Survey ||  || align=right | 1.3 km || 
|-id=005 bgcolor=#E9E9E9
| 501005 ||  || — || September 3, 2013 || Catalina || CSS || EUN || align=right | 1.0 km || 
|-id=006 bgcolor=#E9E9E9
| 501006 ||  || — || August 8, 2013 || Kitt Peak || Spacewatch ||  || align=right data-sort-value="0.82" | 820 m || 
|-id=007 bgcolor=#E9E9E9
| 501007 ||  || — || October 15, 2009 || La Sagra || OAM Obs. ||  || align=right data-sort-value="0.94" | 940 m || 
|-id=008 bgcolor=#E9E9E9
| 501008 ||  || — || January 29, 2011 || Mount Lemmon || Mount Lemmon Survey || KON || align=right | 2.1 km || 
|-id=009 bgcolor=#E9E9E9
| 501009 ||  || — || October 12, 2009 || Mount Lemmon || Mount Lemmon Survey || WIT || align=right | 1.5 km || 
|-id=010 bgcolor=#E9E9E9
| 501010 ||  || — || September 3, 2013 || Kitt Peak || Spacewatch ||  || align=right data-sort-value="0.78" | 780 m || 
|-id=011 bgcolor=#E9E9E9
| 501011 ||  || — || September 3, 2013 || Mount Lemmon || Mount Lemmon Survey ||  || align=right | 1.5 km || 
|-id=012 bgcolor=#E9E9E9
| 501012 ||  || — || September 19, 2009 || Kitt Peak || Spacewatch ||  || align=right data-sort-value="0.75" | 750 m || 
|-id=013 bgcolor=#E9E9E9
| 501013 ||  || — || September 3, 2013 || Mount Lemmon || Mount Lemmon Survey ||  || align=right | 1.6 km || 
|-id=014 bgcolor=#fefefe
| 501014 ||  || — || March 13, 2012 || Mount Lemmon || Mount Lemmon Survey ||  || align=right data-sort-value="0.74" | 740 m || 
|-id=015 bgcolor=#E9E9E9
| 501015 ||  || — || October 30, 2005 || Kitt Peak || Spacewatch ||  || align=right | 1.3 km || 
|-id=016 bgcolor=#E9E9E9
| 501016 ||  || — || September 18, 2009 || Kitt Peak || Spacewatch ||  || align=right data-sort-value="0.57" | 570 m || 
|-id=017 bgcolor=#E9E9E9
| 501017 ||  || — || November 19, 2009 || Mount Lemmon || Mount Lemmon Survey ||  || align=right | 1.2 km || 
|-id=018 bgcolor=#E9E9E9
| 501018 ||  || — || September 29, 2009 || Mount Lemmon || Mount Lemmon Survey ||  || align=right data-sort-value="0.98" | 980 m || 
|-id=019 bgcolor=#E9E9E9
| 501019 ||  || — || September 5, 2013 || Kitt Peak || Spacewatch ||  || align=right | 2.1 km || 
|-id=020 bgcolor=#fefefe
| 501020 ||  || — || January 30, 2011 || Haleakala || Pan-STARRS || MAS || align=right data-sort-value="0.70" | 700 m || 
|-id=021 bgcolor=#E9E9E9
| 501021 ||  || — || January 20, 2010 || WISE || WISE ||  || align=right | 1.5 km || 
|-id=022 bgcolor=#E9E9E9
| 501022 ||  || — || October 26, 2009 || Kitt Peak || Spacewatch ||  || align=right | 1.2 km || 
|-id=023 bgcolor=#E9E9E9
| 501023 ||  || — || September 16, 2009 || Kitt Peak || Spacewatch ||  || align=right | 1.1 km || 
|-id=024 bgcolor=#E9E9E9
| 501024 ||  || — || September 8, 2013 || Haleakala || Pan-STARRS ||  || align=right | 1.9 km || 
|-id=025 bgcolor=#E9E9E9
| 501025 ||  || — || January 30, 2011 || Haleakala || Pan-STARRS || EUN || align=right | 1.4 km || 
|-id=026 bgcolor=#E9E9E9
| 501026 ||  || — || October 27, 2009 || Mount Lemmon || Mount Lemmon Survey || WIT || align=right | 1.1 km || 
|-id=027 bgcolor=#fefefe
| 501027 ||  || — || September 1, 2013 || Haleakala || Pan-STARRS ||  || align=right data-sort-value="0.83" | 830 m || 
|-id=028 bgcolor=#E9E9E9
| 501028 ||  || — || December 24, 2005 || Kitt Peak || Spacewatch ||  || align=right | 1.6 km || 
|-id=029 bgcolor=#E9E9E9
| 501029 ||  || — || March 13, 2007 || Mount Lemmon || Mount Lemmon Survey ||  || align=right | 1.1 km || 
|-id=030 bgcolor=#E9E9E9
| 501030 ||  || — || January 30, 2011 || Haleakala || Pan-STARRS ||  || align=right data-sort-value="0.96" | 960 m || 
|-id=031 bgcolor=#E9E9E9
| 501031 ||  || — || September 5, 2013 || Kitt Peak || Spacewatch ||  || align=right data-sort-value="0.91" | 910 m || 
|-id=032 bgcolor=#E9E9E9
| 501032 ||  || — || October 8, 2004 || Kitt Peak || Spacewatch || AGN || align=right data-sort-value="0.83" | 830 m || 
|-id=033 bgcolor=#fefefe
| 501033 ||  || — || January 30, 2011 || Haleakala || Pan-STARRS || NYS || align=right data-sort-value="0.61" | 610 m || 
|-id=034 bgcolor=#fefefe
| 501034 ||  || — || September 3, 2013 || Kitt Peak || Spacewatch ||  || align=right data-sort-value="0.83" | 830 m || 
|-id=035 bgcolor=#E9E9E9
| 501035 ||  || — || September 20, 2009 || Mount Lemmon || Mount Lemmon Survey ||  || align=right | 1.6 km || 
|-id=036 bgcolor=#E9E9E9
| 501036 ||  || — || October 7, 2004 || Kitt Peak || Spacewatch ||  || align=right | 2.0 km || 
|-id=037 bgcolor=#E9E9E9
| 501037 ||  || — || October 23, 2009 || Mount Lemmon || Mount Lemmon Survey ||  || align=right | 1.3 km || 
|-id=038 bgcolor=#E9E9E9
| 501038 ||  || — || September 1, 2013 || Mount Lemmon || Mount Lemmon Survey || WIT || align=right | 1.7 km || 
|-id=039 bgcolor=#E9E9E9
| 501039 ||  || — || September 23, 2009 || Mount Lemmon || Mount Lemmon Survey ||  || align=right data-sort-value="0.63" | 630 m || 
|-id=040 bgcolor=#E9E9E9
| 501040 ||  || — || November 4, 2005 || Catalina || CSS ||  || align=right data-sort-value="0.68" | 680 m || 
|-id=041 bgcolor=#E9E9E9
| 501041 ||  || — || October 24, 2009 || Kitt Peak || Spacewatch ||  || align=right data-sort-value="0.92" | 920 m || 
|-id=042 bgcolor=#E9E9E9
| 501042 ||  || — || January 30, 2011 || Haleakala || Pan-STARRS ||  || align=right | 1.3 km || 
|-id=043 bgcolor=#E9E9E9
| 501043 ||  || — || September 30, 2005 || Kitt Peak || Spacewatch ||  || align=right data-sort-value="0.50" | 500 m || 
|-id=044 bgcolor=#E9E9E9
| 501044 ||  || — || September 13, 2013 || Kitt Peak || Spacewatch || EUN || align=right | 1.6 km || 
|-id=045 bgcolor=#E9E9E9
| 501045 ||  || — || September 5, 2013 || Kitt Peak || Spacewatch || MAR || align=right | 1.2 km || 
|-id=046 bgcolor=#E9E9E9
| 501046 ||  || — || April 12, 2011 || Kitt Peak || Spacewatch ||  || align=right | 1.8 km || 
|-id=047 bgcolor=#E9E9E9
| 501047 ||  || — || November 22, 2005 || Kitt Peak || Spacewatch ||  || align=right data-sort-value="0.75" | 750 m || 
|-id=048 bgcolor=#E9E9E9
| 501048 ||  || — || January 30, 2011 || Haleakala || Pan-STARRS ||  || align=right | 1.2 km || 
|-id=049 bgcolor=#E9E9E9
| 501049 ||  || — || April 15, 2012 || Haleakala || Pan-STARRS ||  || align=right | 1.6 km || 
|-id=050 bgcolor=#E9E9E9
| 501050 ||  || — || October 23, 2009 || Kitt Peak || Spacewatch ||  || align=right data-sort-value="0.66" | 660 m || 
|-id=051 bgcolor=#E9E9E9
| 501051 ||  || — || October 7, 2005 || Catalina || CSS ||  || align=right data-sort-value="0.79" | 790 m || 
|-id=052 bgcolor=#fefefe
| 501052 ||  || — || September 10, 2013 || Haleakala || Pan-STARRS ||  || align=right | 1.2 km || 
|-id=053 bgcolor=#E9E9E9
| 501053 ||  || — || September 4, 2013 || Catalina || CSS ||  || align=right | 1.1 km || 
|-id=054 bgcolor=#E9E9E9
| 501054 ||  || — || September 14, 2013 || Catalina || CSS ||  || align=right | 1.0 km || 
|-id=055 bgcolor=#E9E9E9
| 501055 ||  || — || September 16, 2009 || Kitt Peak || Spacewatch ||  || align=right | 1.3 km || 
|-id=056 bgcolor=#E9E9E9
| 501056 ||  || — || September 1, 2013 || Mount Lemmon || Mount Lemmon Survey ||  || align=right | 1.3 km || 
|-id=057 bgcolor=#E9E9E9
| 501057 ||  || — || September 21, 2009 || Mount Lemmon || Mount Lemmon Survey ||  || align=right | 1.2 km || 
|-id=058 bgcolor=#E9E9E9
| 501058 ||  || — || February 14, 2010 || WISE || WISE ||  || align=right | 1.4 km || 
|-id=059 bgcolor=#fefefe
| 501059 ||  || — || August 15, 2009 || La Sagra || OAM Obs. ||  || align=right data-sort-value="0.82" | 820 m || 
|-id=060 bgcolor=#E9E9E9
| 501060 ||  || — || October 30, 2009 || Mount Lemmon || Mount Lemmon Survey || ADE || align=right data-sort-value="0.78" | 780 m || 
|-id=061 bgcolor=#E9E9E9
| 501061 ||  || — || February 7, 2010 || WISE || WISE || BRU || align=right | 2.2 km || 
|-id=062 bgcolor=#E9E9E9
| 501062 ||  || — || January 27, 2006 || Anderson Mesa || LONEOS ||  || align=right | 1.5 km || 
|-id=063 bgcolor=#E9E9E9
| 501063 ||  || — || May 21, 2012 || Haleakala || Pan-STARRS ||  || align=right | 3.1 km || 
|-id=064 bgcolor=#E9E9E9
| 501064 ||  || — || November 9, 2009 || Kitt Peak || Spacewatch ||  || align=right | 1.4 km || 
|-id=065 bgcolor=#E9E9E9
| 501065 ||  || — || March 4, 2011 || Mount Lemmon || Mount Lemmon Survey || AGN || align=right | 1.1 km || 
|-id=066 bgcolor=#E9E9E9
| 501066 ||  || — || September 17, 2009 || Kitt Peak || Spacewatch || MAR || align=right | 1.2 km || 
|-id=067 bgcolor=#E9E9E9
| 501067 ||  || — || September 28, 2009 || Kitt Peak || Spacewatch ||  || align=right | 1.2 km || 
|-id=068 bgcolor=#E9E9E9
| 501068 ||  || — || November 22, 2009 || Mount Lemmon || Mount Lemmon Survey ||  || align=right | 1.1 km || 
|-id=069 bgcolor=#fefefe
| 501069 ||  || — || January 30, 2011 || Haleakala || Pan-STARRS ||  || align=right data-sort-value="0.81" | 810 m || 
|-id=070 bgcolor=#E9E9E9
| 501070 ||  || — || November 12, 2005 || Kitt Peak || Spacewatch ||  || align=right data-sort-value="0.71" | 710 m || 
|-id=071 bgcolor=#E9E9E9
| 501071 ||  || — || September 12, 2009 || Catalina || CSS ||  || align=right data-sort-value="0.99" | 990 m || 
|-id=072 bgcolor=#E9E9E9
| 501072 ||  || — || November 18, 2009 || Kitt Peak || Spacewatch || GEF || align=right | 1.9 km || 
|-id=073 bgcolor=#E9E9E9
| 501073 ||  || — || August 15, 2013 || Haleakala || Pan-STARRS ||  || align=right | 1.3 km || 
|-id=074 bgcolor=#E9E9E9
| 501074 ||  || — || September 4, 2000 || Anderson Mesa || LONEOS ||  || align=right | 1.5 km || 
|-id=075 bgcolor=#E9E9E9
| 501075 ||  || — || September 28, 2013 || Mount Lemmon || Mount Lemmon Survey ||  || align=right data-sort-value="0.77" | 770 m || 
|-id=076 bgcolor=#E9E9E9
| 501076 ||  || — || September 14, 2013 || Mount Lemmon || Mount Lemmon Survey || MAR || align=right | 1.3 km || 
|-id=077 bgcolor=#E9E9E9
| 501077 ||  || — || January 31, 2006 || Kitt Peak || Spacewatch ||  || align=right | 1.5 km || 
|-id=078 bgcolor=#E9E9E9
| 501078 ||  || — || September 1, 2013 || Mount Lemmon || Mount Lemmon Survey ||  || align=right data-sort-value="0.91" | 910 m || 
|-id=079 bgcolor=#E9E9E9
| 501079 ||  || — || September 2, 2008 || La Sagra || OAM Obs. ||  || align=right | 3.1 km || 
|-id=080 bgcolor=#E9E9E9
| 501080 ||  || — || October 12, 2009 || La Sagra || OAM Obs. ||  || align=right data-sort-value="0.72" | 720 m || 
|-id=081 bgcolor=#E9E9E9
| 501081 ||  || — || October 5, 2004 || Anderson Mesa || LONEOS || ADE || align=right | 1.6 km || 
|-id=082 bgcolor=#E9E9E9
| 501082 ||  || — || August 27, 2013 || Haleakala || Pan-STARRS || MAR || align=right | 1.3 km || 
|-id=083 bgcolor=#E9E9E9
| 501083 ||  || — || January 25, 2006 || Kitt Peak || Spacewatch ||  || align=right | 1.6 km || 
|-id=084 bgcolor=#d6d6d6
| 501084 ||  || — || September 30, 2013 || Mount Lemmon || Mount Lemmon Survey || TIR || align=right | 3.5 km || 
|-id=085 bgcolor=#E9E9E9
| 501085 ||  || — || January 30, 2011 || Haleakala || Pan-STARRS ||  || align=right data-sort-value="0.93" | 930 m || 
|-id=086 bgcolor=#E9E9E9
| 501086 ||  || — || January 25, 2011 || Catalina || CSS || HNS || align=right | 1.4 km || 
|-id=087 bgcolor=#fefefe
| 501087 ||  || — || January 28, 2011 || Catalina || CSS || LCI || align=right data-sort-value="0.93" | 930 m || 
|-id=088 bgcolor=#E9E9E9
| 501088 ||  || — || November 1, 2005 || Mount Lemmon || Mount Lemmon Survey ||  || align=right | 1.4 km || 
|-id=089 bgcolor=#E9E9E9
| 501089 ||  || — || October 24, 2009 || Catalina || CSS ||  || align=right | 1.7 km || 
|-id=090 bgcolor=#E9E9E9
| 501090 ||  || — || September 5, 2013 || Kitt Peak || Spacewatch ||  || align=right data-sort-value="0.82" | 820 m || 
|-id=091 bgcolor=#E9E9E9
| 501091 ||  || — || November 21, 2009 || Mount Lemmon || Mount Lemmon Survey ||  || align=right | 1.3 km || 
|-id=092 bgcolor=#fefefe
| 501092 ||  || — || September 1, 2013 || Mount Lemmon || Mount Lemmon Survey ||  || align=right data-sort-value="0.75" | 750 m || 
|-id=093 bgcolor=#E9E9E9
| 501093 ||  || — || September 27, 2005 || Kitt Peak || Spacewatch ||  || align=right data-sort-value="0.70" | 700 m || 
|-id=094 bgcolor=#E9E9E9
| 501094 ||  || — || November 12, 2005 || Kitt Peak || Spacewatch ||  || align=right | 1.4 km || 
|-id=095 bgcolor=#E9E9E9
| 501095 ||  || — || September 28, 2013 || Haleakala || Pan-STARRS ||  || align=right | 1.3 km || 
|-id=096 bgcolor=#E9E9E9
| 501096 ||  || — || September 14, 2013 || Mount Lemmon || Mount Lemmon Survey ||  || align=right | 1.2 km || 
|-id=097 bgcolor=#d6d6d6
| 501097 ||  || — || September 29, 2013 || Mount Lemmon || Mount Lemmon Survey || EOS || align=right | 1.7 km || 
|-id=098 bgcolor=#E9E9E9
| 501098 ||  || — || September 29, 2013 || Mount Lemmon || Mount Lemmon Survey ||  || align=right | 1.3 km || 
|-id=099 bgcolor=#E9E9E9
| 501099 ||  || — || September 29, 2013 || Mount Lemmon || Mount Lemmon Survey ||  || align=right | 2.3 km || 
|-id=100 bgcolor=#E9E9E9
| 501100 ||  || — || September 12, 2013 || Mount Lemmon || Mount Lemmon Survey || RAF || align=right | 1.0 km || 
|}

501101–501200 

|-bgcolor=#E9E9E9
| 501101 ||  || — || January 7, 2006 || Mount Lemmon || Mount Lemmon Survey ||  || align=right | 1.3 km || 
|-id=102 bgcolor=#E9E9E9
| 501102 ||  || — || December 21, 2005 || Kitt Peak || Spacewatch ||  || align=right data-sort-value="0.80" | 800 m || 
|-id=103 bgcolor=#d6d6d6
| 501103 ||  || — || September 30, 2013 || Mount Lemmon || Mount Lemmon Survey || BRA || align=right | 1.8 km || 
|-id=104 bgcolor=#E9E9E9
| 501104 ||  || — || March 29, 2012 || Haleakala || Pan-STARRS ||  || align=right | 1.1 km || 
|-id=105 bgcolor=#C2E0FF
| 501105 ||  || — || September 23, 2013 || Calar Alto-CASADO || S. Hellmich, S. Mottola || other TNOcritical || align=right | 168 km || 
|-id=106 bgcolor=#E9E9E9
| 501106 ||  || — || September 3, 2013 || Kitt Peak || Spacewatch ||  || align=right | 1.1 km || 
|-id=107 bgcolor=#E9E9E9
| 501107 ||  || — || March 9, 2007 || Mount Lemmon || Mount Lemmon Survey ||  || align=right | 1.7 km || 
|-id=108 bgcolor=#E9E9E9
| 501108 ||  || — || December 30, 2005 || Kitt Peak || Spacewatch || MAR || align=right data-sort-value="0.99" | 990 m || 
|-id=109 bgcolor=#E9E9E9
| 501109 ||  || — || September 28, 2013 || Catalina || CSS ||  || align=right | 1.5 km || 
|-id=110 bgcolor=#E9E9E9
| 501110 ||  || — || November 6, 2005 || Kitt Peak || Spacewatch ||  || align=right | 1.7 km || 
|-id=111 bgcolor=#E9E9E9
| 501111 ||  || — || September 7, 2004 || Socorro || LINEAR ||  || align=right | 1.6 km || 
|-id=112 bgcolor=#E9E9E9
| 501112 ||  || — || September 29, 2005 || Mount Lemmon || Mount Lemmon Survey ||  || align=right | 1.3 km || 
|-id=113 bgcolor=#E9E9E9
| 501113 ||  || — || January 30, 2011 || Haleakala || Pan-STARRS ||  || align=right | 1.0 km || 
|-id=114 bgcolor=#fefefe
| 501114 ||  || — || August 20, 2009 || La Sagra || OAM Obs. ||  || align=right data-sort-value="0.95" | 950 m || 
|-id=115 bgcolor=#FA8072
| 501115 ||  || — || August 30, 2009 || Kitt Peak || Spacewatch ||  || align=right | 1.1 km || 
|-id=116 bgcolor=#E9E9E9
| 501116 ||  || — || November 25, 2005 || Kitt Peak || Spacewatch ||  || align=right | 1.0 km || 
|-id=117 bgcolor=#E9E9E9
| 501117 ||  || — || May 8, 2008 || Kitt Peak || Spacewatch ||  || align=right | 1.1 km || 
|-id=118 bgcolor=#E9E9E9
| 501118 ||  || — || November 9, 2009 || Kitt Peak || Spacewatch ||  || align=right data-sort-value="0.71" | 710 m || 
|-id=119 bgcolor=#E9E9E9
| 501119 ||  || — || September 15, 2013 || Haleakala || Pan-STARRS ||  || align=right | 2.0 km || 
|-id=120 bgcolor=#E9E9E9
| 501120 ||  || — || January 23, 2006 || Kitt Peak || Spacewatch ||  || align=right | 1.1 km || 
|-id=121 bgcolor=#E9E9E9
| 501121 ||  || — || October 27, 2005 || Kitt Peak || Spacewatch ||  || align=right data-sort-value="0.64" | 640 m || 
|-id=122 bgcolor=#E9E9E9
| 501122 ||  || — || March 31, 2011 || Haleakala || Pan-STARRS ||  || align=right | 2.6 km || 
|-id=123 bgcolor=#E9E9E9
| 501123 ||  || — || October 1, 2013 || Kitt Peak || Spacewatch ||  || align=right | 1.0 km || 
|-id=124 bgcolor=#E9E9E9
| 501124 ||  || — || September 27, 2008 || Mount Lemmon || Mount Lemmon Survey ||  || align=right | 2.1 km || 
|-id=125 bgcolor=#E9E9E9
| 501125 ||  || — || November 9, 2009 || Kitt Peak || Spacewatch ||  || align=right data-sort-value="0.79" | 790 m || 
|-id=126 bgcolor=#E9E9E9
| 501126 ||  || — || September 30, 2005 || Mount Lemmon || Mount Lemmon Survey ||  || align=right data-sort-value="0.71" | 710 m || 
|-id=127 bgcolor=#E9E9E9
| 501127 ||  || — || January 23, 2006 || Kitt Peak || Spacewatch ||  || align=right | 2.1 km || 
|-id=128 bgcolor=#E9E9E9
| 501128 ||  || — || October 12, 2009 || Mount Lemmon || Mount Lemmon Survey ||  || align=right | 1.3 km || 
|-id=129 bgcolor=#E9E9E9
| 501129 ||  || — || September 20, 2009 || Mount Lemmon || Mount Lemmon Survey ||  || align=right data-sort-value="0.81" | 810 m || 
|-id=130 bgcolor=#E9E9E9
| 501130 ||  || — || October 7, 2005 || Mount Lemmon || Mount Lemmon Survey ||  || align=right data-sort-value="0.82" | 820 m || 
|-id=131 bgcolor=#E9E9E9
| 501131 ||  || — || September 23, 2000 || Socorro || LINEAR || EUN || align=right | 1.1 km || 
|-id=132 bgcolor=#E9E9E9
| 501132 Runkel ||  ||  || March 25, 2011 || Haleakala || Pan-STARRS ||  || align=right | 2.1 km || 
|-id=133 bgcolor=#E9E9E9
| 501133 ||  || — || December 26, 2005 || Mount Lemmon || Mount Lemmon Survey ||  || align=right | 1.0 km || 
|-id=134 bgcolor=#E9E9E9
| 501134 ||  || — || February 28, 2010 || WISE || WISE ||  || align=right data-sort-value="0.74" | 740 m || 
|-id=135 bgcolor=#E9E9E9
| 501135 ||  || — || April 22, 2007 || Kitt Peak || Spacewatch || WIT || align=right | 1.9 km || 
|-id=136 bgcolor=#d6d6d6
| 501136 ||  || — || October 25, 2008 || Mount Lemmon || Mount Lemmon Survey || KOR || align=right | 1.1 km || 
|-id=137 bgcolor=#E9E9E9
| 501137 ||  || — || April 2, 2011 || Haleakala || Pan-STARRS ||  || align=right | 2.2 km || 
|-id=138 bgcolor=#E9E9E9
| 501138 ||  || — || October 27, 2009 || Mount Lemmon || Mount Lemmon Survey || EUN || align=right data-sort-value="0.90" | 900 m || 
|-id=139 bgcolor=#E9E9E9
| 501139 ||  || — || November 26, 2009 || Mount Lemmon || Mount Lemmon Survey ||  || align=right | 1.4 km || 
|-id=140 bgcolor=#E9E9E9
| 501140 ||  || — || October 4, 2013 || Kitt Peak || Spacewatch ||  || align=right | 1.6 km || 
|-id=141 bgcolor=#E9E9E9
| 501141 ||  || — || October 12, 2009 || Mount Lemmon || Mount Lemmon Survey ||  || align=right data-sort-value="0.74" | 740 m || 
|-id=142 bgcolor=#E9E9E9
| 501142 ||  || — || September 10, 2004 || Socorro || LINEAR ||  || align=right | 1.5 km || 
|-id=143 bgcolor=#E9E9E9
| 501143 ||  || — || October 22, 2009 || Mount Lemmon || Mount Lemmon Survey ||  || align=right | 1.2 km || 
|-id=144 bgcolor=#E9E9E9
| 501144 ||  || — || November 21, 2009 || Kitt Peak || Spacewatch ||  || align=right | 1.3 km || 
|-id=145 bgcolor=#E9E9E9
| 501145 ||  || — || April 1, 2008 || Kitt Peak || Spacewatch ||  || align=right | 1.1 km || 
|-id=146 bgcolor=#d6d6d6
| 501146 ||  || — || October 26, 2008 || Kitt Peak || Spacewatch ||  || align=right | 3.9 km || 
|-id=147 bgcolor=#E9E9E9
| 501147 ||  || — || November 6, 1996 || Kitt Peak || Spacewatch ||  || align=right | 1.0 km || 
|-id=148 bgcolor=#E9E9E9
| 501148 ||  || — || September 13, 2013 || Mount Lemmon || Mount Lemmon Survey || HOF || align=right | 1.8 km || 
|-id=149 bgcolor=#E9E9E9
| 501149 ||  || — || July 16, 2013 || Haleakala || Pan-STARRS ||  || align=right | 1.5 km || 
|-id=150 bgcolor=#E9E9E9
| 501150 ||  || — || February 14, 2010 || WISE || WISE ||  || align=right | 2.6 km || 
|-id=151 bgcolor=#E9E9E9
| 501151 ||  || — || April 1, 2008 || Kitt Peak || Spacewatch ||  || align=right | 1.1 km || 
|-id=152 bgcolor=#E9E9E9
| 501152 ||  || — || September 1, 2013 || Mount Lemmon || Mount Lemmon Survey ||  || align=right | 1.1 km || 
|-id=153 bgcolor=#E9E9E9
| 501153 ||  || — || November 17, 2009 || Kitt Peak || Spacewatch ||  || align=right | 1.0 km || 
|-id=154 bgcolor=#E9E9E9
| 501154 ||  || — || September 19, 2009 || Kitt Peak || Spacewatch || RAF || align=right data-sort-value="0.75" | 750 m || 
|-id=155 bgcolor=#E9E9E9
| 501155 ||  || — || September 11, 2004 || Kitt Peak || Spacewatch || LEO || align=right | 1.2 km || 
|-id=156 bgcolor=#E9E9E9
| 501156 ||  || — || September 21, 2009 || Kitt Peak || Spacewatch ||  || align=right | 1.4 km || 
|-id=157 bgcolor=#E9E9E9
| 501157 ||  || — || December 15, 2009 || Catalina || CSS ||  || align=right | 1.6 km || 
|-id=158 bgcolor=#E9E9E9
| 501158 ||  || — || January 21, 2010 || WISE || WISE ||  || align=right | 1.3 km || 
|-id=159 bgcolor=#d6d6d6
| 501159 ||  || — || October 5, 2013 || Haleakala || Pan-STARRS ||  || align=right | 1.8 km || 
|-id=160 bgcolor=#E9E9E9
| 501160 ||  || — || March 12, 2007 || Kitt Peak || Spacewatch || HNS || align=right | 1.2 km || 
|-id=161 bgcolor=#E9E9E9
| 501161 ||  || — || November 9, 2009 || Mount Lemmon || Mount Lemmon Survey ||  || align=right data-sort-value="0.65" | 650 m || 
|-id=162 bgcolor=#fefefe
| 501162 ||  || — || September 30, 2013 || Catalina || CSS || H || align=right data-sort-value="0.67" | 670 m || 
|-id=163 bgcolor=#E9E9E9
| 501163 ||  || — || September 6, 2013 || Kitt Peak || Spacewatch ||  || align=right data-sort-value="0.80" | 800 m || 
|-id=164 bgcolor=#fefefe
| 501164 ||  || — || July 31, 2009 || Kitt Peak || Spacewatch ||  || align=right data-sort-value="0.91" | 910 m || 
|-id=165 bgcolor=#E9E9E9
| 501165 ||  || — || October 10, 1996 || Kitt Peak || Spacewatch ||  || align=right | 1.1 km || 
|-id=166 bgcolor=#E9E9E9
| 501166 ||  || — || March 28, 2011 || Mount Lemmon || Mount Lemmon Survey ||  || align=right | 1.9 km || 
|-id=167 bgcolor=#E9E9E9
| 501167 ||  || — || September 3, 2008 || Kitt Peak || Spacewatch ||  || align=right | 1.9 km || 
|-id=168 bgcolor=#E9E9E9
| 501168 ||  || — || November 16, 2009 || Kitt Peak || Spacewatch ||  || align=right data-sort-value="0.65" | 650 m || 
|-id=169 bgcolor=#E9E9E9
| 501169 ||  || — || October 16, 2001 || Kitt Peak || Spacewatch ||  || align=right data-sort-value="0.75" | 750 m || 
|-id=170 bgcolor=#E9E9E9
| 501170 ||  || — || November 27, 2009 || Mount Lemmon || Mount Lemmon Survey ||  || align=right | 1.2 km || 
|-id=171 bgcolor=#E9E9E9
| 501171 ||  || — || October 1, 2013 || Kitt Peak || Spacewatch ||  || align=right | 1.9 km || 
|-id=172 bgcolor=#E9E9E9
| 501172 ||  || — || May 20, 2012 || Mount Lemmon || Mount Lemmon Survey ||  || align=right | 1.3 km || 
|-id=173 bgcolor=#E9E9E9
| 501173 ||  || — || June 16, 2012 || Mount Lemmon || Mount Lemmon Survey ||  || align=right | 1.4 km || 
|-id=174 bgcolor=#E9E9E9
| 501174 ||  || — || November 9, 2009 || Catalina || CSS ||  || align=right data-sort-value="0.89" | 890 m || 
|-id=175 bgcolor=#E9E9E9
| 501175 ||  || — || August 24, 2008 || Kitt Peak || Spacewatch ||  || align=right | 2.0 km || 
|-id=176 bgcolor=#E9E9E9
| 501176 ||  || — || November 18, 2009 || Kitt Peak || Spacewatch ||  || align=right | 1.1 km || 
|-id=177 bgcolor=#fefefe
| 501177 ||  || — || April 27, 2012 || Haleakala || Pan-STARRS ||  || align=right data-sort-value="0.83" | 830 m || 
|-id=178 bgcolor=#E9E9E9
| 501178 ||  || — || October 2, 2013 || Kitt Peak || Spacewatch ||  || align=right | 2.5 km || 
|-id=179 bgcolor=#E9E9E9
| 501179 ||  || — || October 27, 2009 || La Sagra || OAM Obs. ||  || align=right data-sort-value="0.79" | 790 m || 
|-id=180 bgcolor=#E9E9E9
| 501180 ||  || — || July 20, 2013 || Haleakala || Pan-STARRS ||  || align=right | 2.6 km || 
|-id=181 bgcolor=#E9E9E9
| 501181 ||  || — || January 31, 2006 || Kitt Peak || Spacewatch || AGN || align=right | 1.7 km || 
|-id=182 bgcolor=#E9E9E9
| 501182 ||  || — || March 27, 2012 || Kitt Peak || Spacewatch ||  || align=right | 1.3 km || 
|-id=183 bgcolor=#E9E9E9
| 501183 ||  || — || April 5, 2011 || Mount Lemmon || Mount Lemmon Survey ||  || align=right | 1.5 km || 
|-id=184 bgcolor=#E9E9E9
| 501184 ||  || — || December 10, 2009 || Mount Lemmon || Mount Lemmon Survey || MIS || align=right | 1.0 km || 
|-id=185 bgcolor=#E9E9E9
| 501185 ||  || — || September 13, 2013 || Mount Lemmon || Mount Lemmon Survey ||  || align=right | 1.2 km || 
|-id=186 bgcolor=#E9E9E9
| 501186 ||  || — || July 16, 2013 || Haleakala || Pan-STARRS || EUN || align=right | 1.3 km || 
|-id=187 bgcolor=#E9E9E9
| 501187 ||  || — || October 3, 2013 || Kitt Peak || Spacewatch ||  || align=right | 1.6 km || 
|-id=188 bgcolor=#E9E9E9
| 501188 ||  || — || October 3, 2013 || Kitt Peak || Spacewatch ||  || align=right | 2.2 km || 
|-id=189 bgcolor=#E9E9E9
| 501189 ||  || — || January 12, 2010 || Mount Lemmon || Mount Lemmon Survey ||  || align=right | 1.7 km || 
|-id=190 bgcolor=#E9E9E9
| 501190 ||  || — || October 3, 2013 || Haleakala || Pan-STARRS || WIT || align=right | 2.1 km || 
|-id=191 bgcolor=#E9E9E9
| 501191 ||  || — || September 14, 2013 || Mount Lemmon || Mount Lemmon Survey ||  || align=right | 1.6 km || 
|-id=192 bgcolor=#E9E9E9
| 501192 ||  || — || September 14, 2013 || Mount Lemmon || Mount Lemmon Survey || HNS || align=right | 1.1 km || 
|-id=193 bgcolor=#E9E9E9
| 501193 ||  || — || May 15, 2012 || Haleakala || Pan-STARRS ||  || align=right | 1.5 km || 
|-id=194 bgcolor=#E9E9E9
| 501194 ||  || — || March 31, 2011 || Haleakala || Pan-STARRS ||  || align=right | 2.2 km || 
|-id=195 bgcolor=#E9E9E9
| 501195 ||  || — || December 24, 2005 || Kitt Peak || Spacewatch ||  || align=right data-sort-value="0.51" | 510 m || 
|-id=196 bgcolor=#E9E9E9
| 501196 ||  || — || April 3, 2011 || Haleakala || Pan-STARRS ||  || align=right | 1.4 km || 
|-id=197 bgcolor=#E9E9E9
| 501197 ||  || — || November 26, 2005 || Kitt Peak || Spacewatch ||  || align=right data-sort-value="0.46" | 460 m || 
|-id=198 bgcolor=#E9E9E9
| 501198 ||  || — || November 8, 2009 || Catalina || CSS ||  || align=right data-sort-value="0.92" | 920 m || 
|-id=199 bgcolor=#E9E9E9
| 501199 ||  || — || March 31, 2011 || Haleakala || Pan-STARRS || PAD  WIT || align=right | 1.5 km || 
|-id=200 bgcolor=#fefefe
| 501200 ||  || — || February 27, 2012 || Haleakala || Pan-STARRS ||  || align=right data-sort-value="0.76" | 760 m || 
|}

501201–501300 

|-bgcolor=#E9E9E9
| 501201 ||  || — || January 30, 2011 || Haleakala || Pan-STARRS ||  || align=right | 1.5 km || 
|-id=202 bgcolor=#E9E9E9
| 501202 ||  || — || February 1, 2006 || Kitt Peak || Spacewatch ||  || align=right data-sort-value="0.88" | 880 m || 
|-id=203 bgcolor=#E9E9E9
| 501203 ||  || — || September 23, 2000 || Socorro || LINEAR || BAR || align=right | 2.0 km || 
|-id=204 bgcolor=#E9E9E9
| 501204 ||  || — || February 27, 2006 || Mount Lemmon || Mount Lemmon Survey ||  || align=right | 1.5 km || 
|-id=205 bgcolor=#E9E9E9
| 501205 ||  || — || October 2, 2009 || Mount Lemmon || Mount Lemmon Survey ||  || align=right data-sort-value="0.68" | 680 m || 
|-id=206 bgcolor=#E9E9E9
| 501206 ||  || — || October 3, 2013 || Kitt Peak || Spacewatch || MAR || align=right | 1.1 km || 
|-id=207 bgcolor=#E9E9E9
| 501207 ||  || — || September 15, 2013 || Kitt Peak || Spacewatch || HOF || align=right | 2.1 km || 
|-id=208 bgcolor=#E9E9E9
| 501208 ||  || — || March 17, 2010 || WISE || WISE ||  || align=right | 1.8 km || 
|-id=209 bgcolor=#E9E9E9
| 501209 ||  || — || September 4, 2013 || Mount Lemmon || Mount Lemmon Survey || HOF || align=right | 2.2 km || 
|-id=210 bgcolor=#E9E9E9
| 501210 ||  || — || October 18, 2009 || Mount Lemmon || Mount Lemmon Survey ||  || align=right | 1.1 km || 
|-id=211 bgcolor=#E9E9E9
| 501211 ||  || — || November 20, 2009 || Kitt Peak || Spacewatch ||  || align=right | 1.3 km || 
|-id=212 bgcolor=#E9E9E9
| 501212 ||  || — || December 20, 2009 || Mount Lemmon || Mount Lemmon Survey ||  || align=right | 2.1 km || 
|-id=213 bgcolor=#E9E9E9
| 501213 ||  || — || October 5, 2013 || Haleakala || Pan-STARRS ||  || align=right | 2.2 km || 
|-id=214 bgcolor=#C7FF8F
| 501214 ||  || — || October 5, 2013 || Kitt Peak || M. W. Buie || centaur || align=right | 205 km || 
|-id=215 bgcolor=#E9E9E9
| 501215 ||  || — || November 25, 2005 || Kitt Peak || Spacewatch ||  || align=right data-sort-value="0.99" | 990 m || 
|-id=216 bgcolor=#FA8072
| 501216 ||  || — || March 5, 2010 || Catalina || CSS ||  || align=right | 1.4 km || 
|-id=217 bgcolor=#fefefe
| 501217 ||  || — || October 20, 2013 || Haleakala || Pan-STARRS || H || align=right data-sort-value="0.64" | 640 m || 
|-id=218 bgcolor=#E9E9E9
| 501218 ||  || — || December 10, 2004 || Kitt Peak || Spacewatch ||  || align=right | 2.9 km || 
|-id=219 bgcolor=#E9E9E9
| 501219 ||  || — || September 22, 2009 || Catalina || CSS ||  || align=right | 2.3 km || 
|-id=220 bgcolor=#E9E9E9
| 501220 ||  || — || October 11, 2013 || Catalina || CSS ||  || align=right | 1.7 km || 
|-id=221 bgcolor=#E9E9E9
| 501221 ||  || — || April 2, 2011 || Haleakala || Pan-STARRS ||  || align=right | 3.1 km || 
|-id=222 bgcolor=#E9E9E9
| 501222 ||  || — || September 29, 2009 || Mount Lemmon || Mount Lemmon Survey ||  || align=right data-sort-value="0.95" | 950 m || 
|-id=223 bgcolor=#E9E9E9
| 501223 ||  || — || October 13, 2013 || Mount Lemmon || Mount Lemmon Survey || HOF || align=right | 1.8 km || 
|-id=224 bgcolor=#E9E9E9
| 501224 ||  || — || December 24, 2005 || Kitt Peak || Spacewatch || JUN || align=right data-sort-value="0.71" | 710 m || 
|-id=225 bgcolor=#E9E9E9
| 501225 ||  || — || September 17, 2013 || Mount Lemmon || Mount Lemmon Survey ||  || align=right | 1.5 km || 
|-id=226 bgcolor=#E9E9E9
| 501226 ||  || — || November 10, 2009 || Catalina || CSS || EUN || align=right data-sort-value="0.92" | 920 m || 
|-id=227 bgcolor=#E9E9E9
| 501227 ||  || — || December 29, 2005 || Catalina || CSS ||  || align=right | 1.0 km || 
|-id=228 bgcolor=#E9E9E9
| 501228 ||  || — || September 6, 2013 || Mount Lemmon || Mount Lemmon Survey ||  || align=right | 1.7 km || 
|-id=229 bgcolor=#E9E9E9
| 501229 ||  || — || November 27, 2009 || Mount Lemmon || Mount Lemmon Survey ||  || align=right | 1.1 km || 
|-id=230 bgcolor=#E9E9E9
| 501230 ||  || — || September 17, 2013 || Mount Lemmon || Mount Lemmon Survey || MAR || align=right | 1.0 km || 
|-id=231 bgcolor=#E9E9E9
| 501231 ||  || — || September 6, 2013 || Mount Lemmon || Mount Lemmon Survey || ADE || align=right | 1.2 km || 
|-id=232 bgcolor=#E9E9E9
| 501232 ||  || — || November 22, 2005 || Catalina || CSS ||  || align=right | 1.3 km || 
|-id=233 bgcolor=#E9E9E9
| 501233 ||  || — || December 29, 2005 || Mount Lemmon || Mount Lemmon Survey ||  || align=right | 1.0 km || 
|-id=234 bgcolor=#E9E9E9
| 501234 ||  || — || November 27, 2009 || Mount Lemmon || Mount Lemmon Survey ||  || align=right | 2.5 km || 
|-id=235 bgcolor=#E9E9E9
| 501235 ||  || — || October 6, 2013 || Mount Lemmon || Mount Lemmon Survey ||  || align=right | 1.7 km || 
|-id=236 bgcolor=#E9E9E9
| 501236 ||  || — || October 12, 2013 || XuYi || PMO NEO ||  || align=right | 2.7 km || 
|-id=237 bgcolor=#E9E9E9
| 501237 ||  || — || September 19, 2008 || Kitt Peak || Spacewatch ||  || align=right | 1.8 km || 
|-id=238 bgcolor=#E9E9E9
| 501238 ||  || — || October 1, 2000 || Socorro || LINEAR ||  || align=right | 1.2 km || 
|-id=239 bgcolor=#E9E9E9
| 501239 ||  || — || November 16, 2009 || Socorro || LINEAR ||  || align=right | 1.7 km || 
|-id=240 bgcolor=#E9E9E9
| 501240 ||  || — || October 2, 2013 || Kitt Peak || Spacewatch ||  || align=right data-sort-value="0.91" | 910 m || 
|-id=241 bgcolor=#E9E9E9
| 501241 ||  || — || April 26, 2011 || Mount Lemmon || Mount Lemmon Survey ||  || align=right | 1.5 km || 
|-id=242 bgcolor=#E9E9E9
| 501242 ||  || — || October 3, 2013 || Catalina || CSS ||  || align=right | 1.1 km || 
|-id=243 bgcolor=#FFC2E0
| 501243 ||  || — || November 9, 2013 || Mount Lemmon || Mount Lemmon Survey || APO || align=right data-sort-value="0.16" | 160 m || 
|-id=244 bgcolor=#E9E9E9
| 501244 ||  || — || July 16, 2013 || Haleakala || Pan-STARRS ||  || align=right | 1.5 km || 
|-id=245 bgcolor=#E9E9E9
| 501245 ||  || — || July 20, 2013 || Haleakala || Pan-STARRS || AGN || align=right | 2.1 km || 
|-id=246 bgcolor=#E9E9E9
| 501246 ||  || — || October 12, 2009 || Mount Lemmon || Mount Lemmon Survey || KON || align=right | 1.8 km || 
|-id=247 bgcolor=#E9E9E9
| 501247 ||  || — || November 8, 2009 || Kitt Peak || Spacewatch ||  || align=right | 1.2 km || 
|-id=248 bgcolor=#E9E9E9
| 501248 ||  || — || October 22, 2009 || Catalina || CSS ||  || align=right | 1.2 km || 
|-id=249 bgcolor=#E9E9E9
| 501249 ||  || — || October 3, 2013 || Kitt Peak || Spacewatch ||  || align=right data-sort-value="0.85" | 850 m || 
|-id=250 bgcolor=#E9E9E9
| 501250 ||  || — || September 21, 2000 || Anderson Mesa || LONEOS ||  || align=right | 1.4 km || 
|-id=251 bgcolor=#E9E9E9
| 501251 ||  || — || February 15, 2010 || Catalina || CSS ||  || align=right | 2.0 km || 
|-id=252 bgcolor=#E9E9E9
| 501252 ||  || — || October 8, 2013 || XuYi || PMO NEO ||  || align=right data-sort-value="0.91" | 910 m || 
|-id=253 bgcolor=#E9E9E9
| 501253 ||  || — || January 7, 2010 || Kitt Peak || Spacewatch || JUN || align=right data-sort-value="0.99" | 990 m || 
|-id=254 bgcolor=#E9E9E9
| 501254 ||  || — || October 26, 2009 || Mount Lemmon || Mount Lemmon Survey ||  || align=right | 3.0 km || 
|-id=255 bgcolor=#E9E9E9
| 501255 ||  || — || September 24, 2000 || Socorro || LINEAR || (1547)  IAN || align=right | 1.5 km || 
|-id=256 bgcolor=#E9E9E9
| 501256 ||  || — || January 28, 2006 || Catalina || CSS || BRU || align=right | 2.1 km || 
|-id=257 bgcolor=#E9E9E9
| 501257 ||  || — || November 10, 2009 || Kitt Peak || Spacewatch ||  || align=right data-sort-value="0.78" | 780 m || 
|-id=258 bgcolor=#E9E9E9
| 501258 ||  || — || April 21, 2012 || Mount Lemmon || Mount Lemmon Survey ||  || align=right | 1.7 km || 
|-id=259 bgcolor=#E9E9E9
| 501259 ||  || — || September 17, 2013 || Mount Lemmon || Mount Lemmon Survey ||  || align=right | 2.1 km || 
|-id=260 bgcolor=#E9E9E9
| 501260 ||  || — || November 2, 2013 || Mount Lemmon || Mount Lemmon Survey || HNS || align=right | 1.7 km || 
|-id=261 bgcolor=#E9E9E9
| 501261 ||  || — || October 30, 2013 || Haleakala || Pan-STARRS ||  || align=right | 1.0 km || 
|-id=262 bgcolor=#E9E9E9
| 501262 ||  || — || February 22, 2006 || Kitt Peak || Spacewatch ||  || align=right | 1.8 km || 
|-id=263 bgcolor=#E9E9E9
| 501263 ||  || — || October 30, 2013 || Haleakala || Pan-STARRS ||  || align=right | 1.3 km || 
|-id=264 bgcolor=#E9E9E9
| 501264 ||  || — || October 23, 2004 || Kitt Peak || Spacewatch || HNS || align=right | 1.1 km || 
|-id=265 bgcolor=#E9E9E9
| 501265 ||  || — || November 26, 2013 || XuYi || PMO NEO ||  || align=right | 1.7 km || 
|-id=266 bgcolor=#E9E9E9
| 501266 ||  || — || October 26, 2013 || Mount Lemmon || Mount Lemmon Survey ||  || align=right | 1.9 km || 
|-id=267 bgcolor=#E9E9E9
| 501267 ||  || — || May 1, 2011 || Haleakala || Pan-STARRS || WIT || align=right | 2.2 km || 
|-id=268 bgcolor=#E9E9E9
| 501268 ||  || — || November 27, 2013 || Haleakala || Pan-STARRS ||  || align=right | 1.7 km || 
|-id=269 bgcolor=#d6d6d6
| 501269 ||  || — || October 26, 2013 || Mount Lemmon || Mount Lemmon Survey || EOS || align=right | 2.8 km || 
|-id=270 bgcolor=#d6d6d6
| 501270 ||  || — || November 27, 2013 || Haleakala || Pan-STARRS ||  || align=right | 3.6 km || 
|-id=271 bgcolor=#E9E9E9
| 501271 ||  || — || September 14, 2013 || Catalina || CSS ||  || align=right | 1.6 km || 
|-id=272 bgcolor=#E9E9E9
| 501272 ||  || — || November 18, 2009 || Mount Lemmon || Mount Lemmon Survey ||  || align=right | 1.4 km || 
|-id=273 bgcolor=#E9E9E9
| 501273 ||  || — || October 8, 2008 || Kitt Peak || Spacewatch || HOF || align=right | 2.2 km || 
|-id=274 bgcolor=#E9E9E9
| 501274 ||  || — || September 21, 2008 || Kitt Peak || Spacewatch || AGN || align=right data-sort-value="0.98" | 980 m || 
|-id=275 bgcolor=#E9E9E9
| 501275 ||  || — || December 14, 2004 || Kitt Peak || Spacewatch ||  || align=right | 2.4 km || 
|-id=276 bgcolor=#E9E9E9
| 501276 ||  || — || October 6, 2008 || Mount Lemmon || Mount Lemmon Survey ||  || align=right | 1.8 km || 
|-id=277 bgcolor=#d6d6d6
| 501277 ||  || — || August 13, 2012 || Kitt Peak || Spacewatch ||  || align=right | 3.5 km || 
|-id=278 bgcolor=#E9E9E9
| 501278 ||  || — || January 6, 2010 || Kitt Peak || Spacewatch ||  || align=right | 2.0 km || 
|-id=279 bgcolor=#d6d6d6
| 501279 ||  || — || October 31, 2013 || Mount Lemmon || Mount Lemmon Survey ||  || align=right | 3.3 km || 
|-id=280 bgcolor=#E9E9E9
| 501280 ||  || — || September 21, 2004 || Kitt Peak || Spacewatch ||  || align=right | 1.2 km || 
|-id=281 bgcolor=#E9E9E9
| 501281 ||  || — || July 14, 2013 || Haleakala || Pan-STARRS ||  || align=right | 1.9 km || 
|-id=282 bgcolor=#E9E9E9
| 501282 ||  || — || October 25, 2013 || Catalina || CSS ||  || align=right | 1.6 km || 
|-id=283 bgcolor=#E9E9E9
| 501283 ||  || — || January 6, 2010 || Catalina || CSS ||  || align=right | 2.3 km || 
|-id=284 bgcolor=#E9E9E9
| 501284 ||  || — || September 28, 2013 || Mount Lemmon || Mount Lemmon Survey ||  || align=right | 1.6 km || 
|-id=285 bgcolor=#E9E9E9
| 501285 ||  || — || November 19, 2009 || Mount Lemmon || Mount Lemmon Survey || MRX || align=right data-sort-value="0.94" | 940 m || 
|-id=286 bgcolor=#E9E9E9
| 501286 ||  || — || January 30, 2011 || Haleakala || Pan-STARRS ||  || align=right | 1.6 km || 
|-id=287 bgcolor=#d6d6d6
| 501287 ||  || — || June 6, 2010 || WISE || WISE ||  || align=right | 2.9 km || 
|-id=288 bgcolor=#d6d6d6
| 501288 ||  || — || February 2, 2005 || Kitt Peak || Spacewatch || 615 || align=right | 1.5 km || 
|-id=289 bgcolor=#E9E9E9
| 501289 ||  || — || November 21, 2009 || Mount Lemmon || Mount Lemmon Survey ||  || align=right | 1.5 km || 
|-id=290 bgcolor=#E9E9E9
| 501290 ||  || — || November 1, 2013 || Kitt Peak || Spacewatch ||  || align=right | 1.8 km || 
|-id=291 bgcolor=#E9E9E9
| 501291 ||  || — || November 27, 2009 || Mount Lemmon || Mount Lemmon Survey ||  || align=right | 1.1 km || 
|-id=292 bgcolor=#E9E9E9
| 501292 ||  || — || September 30, 2000 || Anderson Mesa || LONEOS ||  || align=right | 1.8 km || 
|-id=293 bgcolor=#E9E9E9
| 501293 ||  || — || November 16, 2009 || Mount Lemmon || Mount Lemmon Survey ||  || align=right | 1.3 km || 
|-id=294 bgcolor=#E9E9E9
| 501294 ||  || — || January 8, 2010 || Kitt Peak || Spacewatch || AEO || align=right data-sort-value="0.86" | 860 m || 
|-id=295 bgcolor=#d6d6d6
| 501295 ||  || — || January 1, 2009 || Mount Lemmon || Mount Lemmon Survey || TRP || align=right | 2.0 km || 
|-id=296 bgcolor=#E9E9E9
| 501296 ||  || — || September 23, 2000 || Socorro || LINEAR ||  || align=right | 1.7 km || 
|-id=297 bgcolor=#E9E9E9
| 501297 ||  || — || September 2, 2000 || Anderson Mesa || LONEOS ||  || align=right | 1.4 km || 
|-id=298 bgcolor=#E9E9E9
| 501298 ||  || — || December 1, 2005 || Mount Lemmon || Mount Lemmon Survey ||  || align=right | 1.4 km || 
|-id=299 bgcolor=#E9E9E9
| 501299 ||  || — || May 12, 2012 || Haleakala || Pan-STARRS ||  || align=right | 1.5 km || 
|-id=300 bgcolor=#E9E9E9
| 501300 ||  || — || January 22, 2006 || Mount Lemmon || Mount Lemmon Survey ||  || align=right | 1.0 km || 
|}

501301–501400 

|-bgcolor=#E9E9E9
| 501301 ||  || — || October 2, 2013 || Kitt Peak || Spacewatch ||  || align=right | 2.3 km || 
|-id=302 bgcolor=#E9E9E9
| 501302 ||  || — || September 19, 2008 || Kitt Peak || Spacewatch ||  || align=right | 1.9 km || 
|-id=303 bgcolor=#E9E9E9
| 501303 ||  || — || January 11, 2010 || Mount Lemmon || Mount Lemmon Survey ||  || align=right | 1.4 km || 
|-id=304 bgcolor=#E9E9E9
| 501304 ||  || — || November 4, 1999 || Kitt Peak || Spacewatch ||  || align=right | 1.8 km || 
|-id=305 bgcolor=#E9E9E9
| 501305 ||  || — || October 2, 2008 || Mount Lemmon || Mount Lemmon Survey ||  || align=right | 1.6 km || 
|-id=306 bgcolor=#E9E9E9
| 501306 ||  || — || November 8, 2013 || Mount Lemmon || Mount Lemmon Survey ||  || align=right | 2.6 km || 
|-id=307 bgcolor=#E9E9E9
| 501307 ||  || — || December 17, 2009 || Kitt Peak || Spacewatch ||  || align=right | 1.7 km || 
|-id=308 bgcolor=#E9E9E9
| 501308 ||  || — || November 10, 2009 || Mount Lemmon || Mount Lemmon Survey ||  || align=right data-sort-value="0.91" | 910 m || 
|-id=309 bgcolor=#E9E9E9
| 501309 ||  || — || November 27, 2013 || Haleakala || Pan-STARRS || WIT || align=right | 1.8 km || 
|-id=310 bgcolor=#E9E9E9
| 501310 ||  || — || February 21, 2006 || Mount Lemmon || Mount Lemmon Survey ||  || align=right data-sort-value="0.96" | 960 m || 
|-id=311 bgcolor=#E9E9E9
| 501311 ||  || — || November 21, 2009 || Mount Lemmon || Mount Lemmon Survey ||  || align=right | 1.4 km || 
|-id=312 bgcolor=#E9E9E9
| 501312 ||  || — || July 13, 2013 || Haleakala || Pan-STARRS ||  || align=right | 2.3 km || 
|-id=313 bgcolor=#d6d6d6
| 501313 ||  || — || August 6, 2012 || Haleakala || Pan-STARRS ||  || align=right | 2.8 km || 
|-id=314 bgcolor=#E9E9E9
| 501314 ||  || — || November 9, 2013 || Haleakala || Pan-STARRS ||  || align=right | 1.8 km || 
|-id=315 bgcolor=#E9E9E9
| 501315 ||  || — || December 25, 2005 || Kitt Peak || Spacewatch ||  || align=right data-sort-value="0.82" | 820 m || 
|-id=316 bgcolor=#E9E9E9
| 501316 ||  || — || December 30, 2005 || Catalina || CSS || HNS || align=right | 2.4 km || 
|-id=317 bgcolor=#E9E9E9
| 501317 ||  || — || September 27, 2008 || Mount Lemmon || Mount Lemmon Survey || ADE || align=right | 1.9 km || 
|-id=318 bgcolor=#d6d6d6
| 501318 ||  || — || November 28, 2013 || Mount Lemmon || Mount Lemmon Survey ||  || align=right | 2.4 km || 
|-id=319 bgcolor=#E9E9E9
| 501319 ||  || — || September 14, 2013 || Catalina || CSS ||  || align=right | 2.4 km || 
|-id=320 bgcolor=#E9E9E9
| 501320 ||  || — || May 1, 2011 || Haleakala || Pan-STARRS || GEF || align=right | 1.6 km || 
|-id=321 bgcolor=#E9E9E9
| 501321 ||  || — || September 12, 2004 || Socorro || LINEAR ||  || align=right | 1.2 km || 
|-id=322 bgcolor=#E9E9E9
| 501322 ||  || — || January 2, 2006 || Mount Lemmon || Mount Lemmon Survey ||  || align=right data-sort-value="0.81" | 810 m || 
|-id=323 bgcolor=#E9E9E9
| 501323 ||  || — || August 23, 2004 || Kitt Peak || Spacewatch ||  || align=right | 1.3 km || 
|-id=324 bgcolor=#E9E9E9
| 501324 ||  || — || January 6, 2010 || Kitt Peak || Spacewatch || MRX || align=right data-sort-value="0.81" | 810 m || 
|-id=325 bgcolor=#E9E9E9
| 501325 ||  || — || October 24, 2013 || Kitt Peak || Spacewatch || MAR || align=right | 1.8 km || 
|-id=326 bgcolor=#E9E9E9
| 501326 ||  || — || January 7, 2006 || Mount Lemmon || Mount Lemmon Survey ||  || align=right | 1.3 km || 
|-id=327 bgcolor=#d6d6d6
| 501327 ||  || — || December 4, 2008 || Mount Lemmon || Mount Lemmon Survey || EOS || align=right | 1.7 km || 
|-id=328 bgcolor=#d6d6d6
| 501328 ||  || — || October 28, 2013 || Mount Lemmon || Mount Lemmon Survey || TEL || align=right | 1.4 km || 
|-id=329 bgcolor=#E9E9E9
| 501329 ||  || — || November 28, 2013 || Kitt Peak || Spacewatch ||  || align=right | 1.8 km || 
|-id=330 bgcolor=#E9E9E9
| 501330 ||  || — || December 17, 2009 || Mount Lemmon || Mount Lemmon Survey ||  || align=right | 1.4 km || 
|-id=331 bgcolor=#E9E9E9
| 501331 ||  || — || October 20, 1999 || Kitt Peak || Spacewatch ||  || align=right | 1.8 km || 
|-id=332 bgcolor=#E9E9E9
| 501332 ||  || — || November 28, 2013 || Mount Lemmon || Mount Lemmon Survey ||  || align=right | 2.0 km || 
|-id=333 bgcolor=#E9E9E9
| 501333 ||  || — || November 27, 2000 || Kitt Peak || Spacewatch ||  || align=right | 1.1 km || 
|-id=334 bgcolor=#E9E9E9
| 501334 ||  || — || October 24, 2008 || Mount Lemmon || Mount Lemmon Survey || PAD || align=right | 1.2 km || 
|-id=335 bgcolor=#E9E9E9
| 501335 ||  || — || November 28, 2013 || Mount Lemmon || Mount Lemmon Survey ||  || align=right | 2.2 km || 
|-id=336 bgcolor=#E9E9E9
| 501336 ||  || — || November 24, 2009 || Catalina || CSS || BRU || align=right | 2.7 km || 
|-id=337 bgcolor=#d6d6d6
| 501337 ||  || — || December 13, 2013 || Mount Lemmon || Mount Lemmon Survey ||  || align=right | 2.7 km || 
|-id=338 bgcolor=#E9E9E9
| 501338 ||  || — || October 26, 2013 || Catalina || CSS ||  || align=right | 2.2 km || 
|-id=339 bgcolor=#d6d6d6
| 501339 ||  || — || October 8, 2012 || Haleakala || Pan-STARRS || EOS || align=right | 1.9 km || 
|-id=340 bgcolor=#d6d6d6
| 501340 ||  || — || December 23, 2013 || Mount Lemmon || Mount Lemmon Survey || TIR || align=right | 3.7 km || 
|-id=341 bgcolor=#E9E9E9
| 501341 ||  || — || November 28, 2013 || Mount Lemmon || Mount Lemmon Survey ||  || align=right | 2.5 km || 
|-id=342 bgcolor=#d6d6d6
| 501342 ||  || — || December 24, 2013 || Mount Lemmon || Mount Lemmon Survey ||  || align=right | 3.0 km || 
|-id=343 bgcolor=#E9E9E9
| 501343 ||  || — || January 14, 2001 || Kitt Peak || Spacewatch ||  || align=right | 1.7 km || 
|-id=344 bgcolor=#d6d6d6
| 501344 ||  || — || June 15, 2005 || Mount Lemmon || Mount Lemmon Survey ||  || align=right | 3.1 km || 
|-id=345 bgcolor=#E9E9E9
| 501345 ||  || — || March 1, 2005 || Kitt Peak || Spacewatch ||  || align=right | 2.0 km || 
|-id=346 bgcolor=#E9E9E9
| 501346 ||  || — || December 2, 2004 || Kitt Peak || Spacewatch ||  || align=right | 1.7 km || 
|-id=347 bgcolor=#d6d6d6
| 501347 ||  || — || November 29, 2013 || Mount Lemmon || Mount Lemmon Survey ||  || align=right | 3.5 km || 
|-id=348 bgcolor=#d6d6d6
| 501348 ||  || — || December 25, 2013 || Mount Lemmon || Mount Lemmon Survey ||  || align=right | 3.1 km || 
|-id=349 bgcolor=#E9E9E9
| 501349 ||  || — || November 14, 2013 || Mount Lemmon || Mount Lemmon Survey ||  || align=right | 1.4 km || 
|-id=350 bgcolor=#E9E9E9
| 501350 ||  || — || November 27, 2013 || Haleakala || Pan-STARRS ||  || align=right | 1.1 km || 
|-id=351 bgcolor=#d6d6d6
| 501351 ||  || — || August 6, 2011 || Haleakala || Pan-STARRS ||  || align=right | 5.5 km || 
|-id=352 bgcolor=#E9E9E9
| 501352 ||  || — || May 21, 2012 || Haleakala || Pan-STARRS ||  || align=right | 1.1 km || 
|-id=353 bgcolor=#E9E9E9
| 501353 ||  || — || November 20, 2000 || Kitt Peak || Spacewatch ||  || align=right | 1.1 km || 
|-id=354 bgcolor=#d6d6d6
| 501354 ||  || — || December 22, 2008 || Kitt Peak || Spacewatch ||  || align=right | 2.1 km || 
|-id=355 bgcolor=#d6d6d6
| 501355 ||  || — || August 17, 2012 || Haleakala || Pan-STARRS ||  || align=right | 2.5 km || 
|-id=356 bgcolor=#d6d6d6
| 501356 ||  || — || October 24, 2007 || Mount Lemmon || Mount Lemmon Survey || HYG || align=right | 2.8 km || 
|-id=357 bgcolor=#E9E9E9
| 501357 ||  || — || December 18, 2009 || Mount Lemmon || Mount Lemmon Survey ||  || align=right | 1.3 km || 
|-id=358 bgcolor=#d6d6d6
| 501358 ||  || — || November 2, 2013 || Mount Lemmon || Mount Lemmon Survey ||  || align=right | 2.3 km || 
|-id=359 bgcolor=#d6d6d6
| 501359 ||  || — || November 30, 2008 || Kitt Peak || Spacewatch ||  || align=right | 2.2 km || 
|-id=360 bgcolor=#E9E9E9
| 501360 ||  || — || October 21, 1995 || Kitt Peak || Spacewatch ||  || align=right | 1.1 km || 
|-id=361 bgcolor=#d6d6d6
| 501361 ||  || — || December 26, 2013 || Mount Lemmon || Mount Lemmon Survey || 615 || align=right | 2.4 km || 
|-id=362 bgcolor=#d6d6d6
| 501362 ||  || — || December 26, 2013 || Mount Lemmon || Mount Lemmon Survey || TIR || align=right | 2.6 km || 
|-id=363 bgcolor=#E9E9E9
| 501363 ||  || — || December 26, 2013 || Haleakala || Pan-STARRS ||  || align=right | 1.2 km || 
|-id=364 bgcolor=#E9E9E9
| 501364 ||  || — || August 11, 2012 || Haleakala || Pan-STARRS || (194) || align=right | 1.4 km || 
|-id=365 bgcolor=#E9E9E9
| 501365 ||  || — || November 11, 2004 || Kitt Peak || Spacewatch ||  || align=right | 1.3 km || 
|-id=366 bgcolor=#d6d6d6
| 501366 ||  || — || December 26, 2013 || Kitt Peak || Spacewatch ||  || align=right | 3.0 km || 
|-id=367 bgcolor=#E9E9E9
| 501367 ||  || — || September 19, 2003 || Kitt Peak || Spacewatch ||  || align=right | 2.0 km || 
|-id=368 bgcolor=#d6d6d6
| 501368 ||  || — || December 26, 2013 || Kitt Peak || Spacewatch ||  || align=right | 2.7 km || 
|-id=369 bgcolor=#d6d6d6
| 501369 ||  || — || October 18, 2012 || Mount Lemmon || Mount Lemmon Survey ||  || align=right | 2.7 km || 
|-id=370 bgcolor=#d6d6d6
| 501370 ||  || — || October 20, 2012 || Haleakala || Pan-STARRS ||  || align=right | 2.9 km || 
|-id=371 bgcolor=#d6d6d6
| 501371 ||  || — || October 30, 2008 || Mount Lemmon || Mount Lemmon Survey ||  || align=right | 3.4 km || 
|-id=372 bgcolor=#d6d6d6
| 501372 ||  || — || December 13, 2013 || Mount Lemmon || Mount Lemmon Survey || HYG || align=right | 2.2 km || 
|-id=373 bgcolor=#d6d6d6
| 501373 ||  || — || November 8, 2013 || Mount Lemmon || Mount Lemmon Survey || HYG || align=right | 2.9 km || 
|-id=374 bgcolor=#E9E9E9
| 501374 ||  || — || September 26, 2008 || Mount Lemmon || Mount Lemmon Survey ||  || align=right | 2.3 km || 
|-id=375 bgcolor=#E9E9E9
| 501375 ||  || — || February 13, 2010 || Catalina || CSS || ADE || align=right | 1.4 km || 
|-id=376 bgcolor=#d6d6d6
| 501376 ||  || — || January 1, 1998 || Kitt Peak || Spacewatch ||  || align=right | 2.9 km || 
|-id=377 bgcolor=#E9E9E9
| 501377 ||  || — || November 28, 2013 || Mount Lemmon || Mount Lemmon Survey ||  || align=right | 2.2 km || 
|-id=378 bgcolor=#d6d6d6
| 501378 ||  || — || November 18, 2007 || Mount Lemmon || Mount Lemmon Survey || EOS || align=right | 1.9 km || 
|-id=379 bgcolor=#d6d6d6
| 501379 ||  || — || October 8, 2012 || Haleakala || Pan-STARRS ||  || align=right | 3.3 km || 
|-id=380 bgcolor=#d6d6d6
| 501380 ||  || — || December 27, 2013 || Kitt Peak || Spacewatch ||  || align=right | 1.9 km || 
|-id=381 bgcolor=#d6d6d6
| 501381 ||  || — || October 8, 2012 || Haleakala || Pan-STARRS || VER || align=right | 3.3 km || 
|-id=382 bgcolor=#d6d6d6
| 501382 ||  || — || December 10, 2013 || Mount Lemmon || Mount Lemmon Survey || EOS || align=right | 3.0 km || 
|-id=383 bgcolor=#d6d6d6
| 501383 ||  || — || March 16, 2009 || Mount Lemmon || Mount Lemmon Survey ||  || align=right | 4.3 km || 
|-id=384 bgcolor=#E9E9E9
| 501384 ||  || — || December 4, 2013 || XuYi || PMO NEO ||  || align=right | 1.1 km || 
|-id=385 bgcolor=#d6d6d6
| 501385 ||  || — || October 17, 2012 || Haleakala || Pan-STARRS ||  || align=right | 2.7 km || 
|-id=386 bgcolor=#d6d6d6
| 501386 ||  || — || December 30, 2013 || Mount Lemmon || Mount Lemmon Survey ||  || align=right | 3.3 km || 
|-id=387 bgcolor=#d6d6d6
| 501387 ||  || — || February 1, 2009 || Kitt Peak || Spacewatch || EOS || align=right | 1.7 km || 
|-id=388 bgcolor=#d6d6d6
| 501388 ||  || — || September 26, 2012 || Mount Lemmon || Mount Lemmon Survey ||  || align=right | 2.6 km || 
|-id=389 bgcolor=#d6d6d6
| 501389 ||  || — || October 8, 2012 || Haleakala || Pan-STARRS ||  || align=right | 3.2 km || 
|-id=390 bgcolor=#d6d6d6
| 501390 ||  || — || December 26, 2013 || Mount Lemmon || Mount Lemmon Survey ||  || align=right | 3.0 km || 
|-id=391 bgcolor=#d6d6d6
| 501391 ||  || — || December 26, 2013 || Mount Lemmon || Mount Lemmon Survey ||  || align=right | 2.6 km || 
|-id=392 bgcolor=#d6d6d6
| 501392 ||  || — || December 26, 2013 || Mount Lemmon || Mount Lemmon Survey || NAE || align=right | 2.2 km || 
|-id=393 bgcolor=#E9E9E9
| 501393 ||  || — || October 7, 2012 || Haleakala || Pan-STARRS ||  || align=right | 2.1 km || 
|-id=394 bgcolor=#d6d6d6
| 501394 ||  || — || October 8, 2012 || Haleakala || Pan-STARRS || EOS || align=right | 3.1 km || 
|-id=395 bgcolor=#d6d6d6
| 501395 ||  || — || October 15, 2012 || Kitt Peak || Spacewatch ||  || align=right | 3.9 km || 
|-id=396 bgcolor=#E9E9E9
| 501396 ||  || — || September 3, 2008 || La Sagra || OAM Obs. ||  || align=right | 1.1 km || 
|-id=397 bgcolor=#E9E9E9
| 501397 ||  || — || August 6, 2008 || Siding Spring || SSS || JUN || align=right | 1.3 km || 
|-id=398 bgcolor=#d6d6d6
| 501398 ||  || — || December 28, 2013 || Kitt Peak || Spacewatch ||  || align=right | 2.7 km || 
|-id=399 bgcolor=#d6d6d6
| 501399 ||  || — || December 22, 2003 || Kitt Peak || Spacewatch ||  || align=right | 2.0 km || 
|-id=400 bgcolor=#E9E9E9
| 501400 ||  || — || November 27, 2013 || Kitt Peak || Spacewatch ||  || align=right | 2.3 km || 
|}

501401–501500 

|-bgcolor=#d6d6d6
| 501401 ||  || — || December 30, 2013 || Kitt Peak || Spacewatch ||  || align=right | 2.4 km || 
|-id=402 bgcolor=#d6d6d6
| 501402 ||  || — || October 8, 2012 || Haleakala || Pan-STARRS || EOS || align=right | 4.0 km || 
|-id=403 bgcolor=#d6d6d6
| 501403 ||  || — || October 14, 2007 || Mount Lemmon || Mount Lemmon Survey ||  || align=right | 1.9 km || 
|-id=404 bgcolor=#d6d6d6
| 501404 ||  || — || December 30, 2013 || Kitt Peak || Spacewatch ||  || align=right | 2.7 km || 
|-id=405 bgcolor=#d6d6d6
| 501405 ||  || — || October 20, 2012 || Haleakala || Pan-STARRS || EOS || align=right | 2.6 km || 
|-id=406 bgcolor=#d6d6d6
| 501406 ||  || — || January 20, 2009 || Kitt Peak || Spacewatch || HYG || align=right | 2.2 km || 
|-id=407 bgcolor=#d6d6d6
| 501407 ||  || — || September 18, 2012 || Mount Lemmon || Mount Lemmon Survey || EOS || align=right | 1.6 km || 
|-id=408 bgcolor=#d6d6d6
| 501408 ||  || — || May 22, 2006 || Mount Lemmon || Mount Lemmon Survey ||  || align=right | 3.5 km || 
|-id=409 bgcolor=#E9E9E9
| 501409 ||  || — || September 28, 2008 || Mount Lemmon || Mount Lemmon Survey ||  || align=right | 1.7 km || 
|-id=410 bgcolor=#d6d6d6
| 501410 ||  || — || October 18, 2012 || Haleakala || Pan-STARRS ||  || align=right | 2.5 km || 
|-id=411 bgcolor=#d6d6d6
| 501411 ||  || — || December 30, 2013 || Mount Lemmon || Mount Lemmon Survey ||  || align=right | 2.5 km || 
|-id=412 bgcolor=#d6d6d6
| 501412 ||  || — || January 29, 2009 || Catalina || CSS ||  || align=right | 4.2 km || 
|-id=413 bgcolor=#d6d6d6
| 501413 ||  || — || November 18, 2007 || Mount Lemmon || Mount Lemmon Survey || HYG || align=right | 2.4 km || 
|-id=414 bgcolor=#E9E9E9
| 501414 ||  || — || October 6, 2012 || Haleakala || Pan-STARRS ||  || align=right | 2.5 km || 
|-id=415 bgcolor=#d6d6d6
| 501415 ||  || — || December 7, 2013 || Haleakala || Pan-STARRS ||  || align=right | 2.7 km || 
|-id=416 bgcolor=#d6d6d6
| 501416 ||  || — || March 18, 2010 || Mount Lemmon || Mount Lemmon Survey ||  || align=right | 1.8 km || 
|-id=417 bgcolor=#E9E9E9
| 501417 ||  || — || December 31, 2013 || Mount Lemmon || Mount Lemmon Survey ||  || align=right | 1.5 km || 
|-id=418 bgcolor=#d6d6d6
| 501418 ||  || — || July 31, 2011 || Haleakala || Pan-STARRS ||  || align=right | 2.9 km || 
|-id=419 bgcolor=#d6d6d6
| 501419 ||  || — || October 14, 2012 || Mount Lemmon || Mount Lemmon Survey || 7:4 || align=right | 2.8 km || 
|-id=420 bgcolor=#d6d6d6
| 501420 ||  || — || August 27, 2006 || Kitt Peak || Spacewatch ||  || align=right | 2.9 km || 
|-id=421 bgcolor=#d6d6d6
| 501421 ||  || — || November 12, 2012 || Haleakala || Pan-STARRS ||  || align=right | 4.0 km || 
|-id=422 bgcolor=#d6d6d6
| 501422 ||  || — || September 9, 2007 || Kitt Peak || Spacewatch ||  || align=right | 2.0 km || 
|-id=423 bgcolor=#d6d6d6
| 501423 ||  || — || January 18, 2009 || Kitt Peak || Spacewatch ||  || align=right | 3.0 km || 
|-id=424 bgcolor=#E9E9E9
| 501424 ||  || — || December 11, 2004 || Kitt Peak || Spacewatch ||  || align=right | 1.1 km || 
|-id=425 bgcolor=#d6d6d6
| 501425 ||  || — || October 6, 2012 || Haleakala || Pan-STARRS ||  || align=right | 3.1 km || 
|-id=426 bgcolor=#E9E9E9
| 501426 ||  || — || October 6, 2008 || Catalina || CSS ||  || align=right | 2.2 km || 
|-id=427 bgcolor=#d6d6d6
| 501427 ||  || — || February 19, 2009 || Mount Lemmon || Mount Lemmon Survey ||  || align=right | 2.4 km || 
|-id=428 bgcolor=#d6d6d6
| 501428 ||  || — || October 17, 2001 || Socorro || LINEAR ||  || align=right | 3.5 km || 
|-id=429 bgcolor=#d6d6d6
| 501429 ||  || — || December 11, 2013 || Haleakala || Pan-STARRS || TIR || align=right | 2.6 km || 
|-id=430 bgcolor=#E9E9E9
| 501430 ||  || — || January 11, 2010 || Mount Lemmon || Mount Lemmon Survey ||  || align=right | 1.0 km || 
|-id=431 bgcolor=#E9E9E9
| 501431 ||  || — || February 13, 2010 || Catalina || CSS ||  || align=right | 1.8 km || 
|-id=432 bgcolor=#d6d6d6
| 501432 ||  || — || October 19, 2007 || Catalina || CSS || EOS || align=right | 3.7 km || 
|-id=433 bgcolor=#d6d6d6
| 501433 ||  || — || January 1, 2014 || Haleakala || Pan-STARRS ||  || align=right | 2.6 km || 
|-id=434 bgcolor=#E9E9E9
| 501434 ||  || — || October 29, 2008 || Mount Lemmon || Mount Lemmon Survey ||  || align=right | 1.8 km || 
|-id=435 bgcolor=#d6d6d6
| 501435 ||  || — || December 13, 2013 || Mount Lemmon || Mount Lemmon Survey || VER || align=right | 2.9 km || 
|-id=436 bgcolor=#d6d6d6
| 501436 ||  || — || November 24, 2008 || Mount Lemmon || Mount Lemmon Survey ||  || align=right | 3.7 km || 
|-id=437 bgcolor=#d6d6d6
| 501437 ||  || — || November 5, 2007 || Mount Lemmon || Mount Lemmon Survey ||  || align=right | 2.0 km || 
|-id=438 bgcolor=#d6d6d6
| 501438 ||  || — || January 1, 2014 || Kitt Peak || Spacewatch ||  || align=right | 2.7 km || 
|-id=439 bgcolor=#d6d6d6
| 501439 ||  || — || November 2, 2013 || Mount Lemmon || Mount Lemmon Survey ||  || align=right | 2.8 km || 
|-id=440 bgcolor=#d6d6d6
| 501440 ||  || — || February 10, 2010 || WISE || WISE ||  || align=right | 3.2 km || 
|-id=441 bgcolor=#d6d6d6
| 501441 ||  || — || October 6, 2012 || Haleakala || Pan-STARRS || EOS || align=right | 3.4 km || 
|-id=442 bgcolor=#d6d6d6
| 501442 ||  || — || October 10, 2007 || Mount Lemmon || Mount Lemmon Survey ||  || align=right | 2.2 km || 
|-id=443 bgcolor=#d6d6d6
| 501443 ||  || — || August 6, 2010 || WISE || WISE || EUP || align=right | 4.7 km || 
|-id=444 bgcolor=#d6d6d6
| 501444 ||  || — || October 23, 2012 || Haleakala || Pan-STARRS ||  || align=right | 4.4 km || 
|-id=445 bgcolor=#d6d6d6
| 501445 ||  || — || March 15, 2009 || La Sagra || OAM Obs. ||  || align=right | 4.9 km || 
|-id=446 bgcolor=#E9E9E9
| 501446 ||  || — || September 4, 2008 || Kitt Peak || Spacewatch ||  || align=right data-sort-value="0.95" | 950 m || 
|-id=447 bgcolor=#d6d6d6
| 501447 ||  || — || December 5, 2008 || Mount Lemmon || Mount Lemmon Survey ||  || align=right | 2.6 km || 
|-id=448 bgcolor=#d6d6d6
| 501448 ||  || — || January 1, 2009 || Mount Lemmon || Mount Lemmon Survey || EOS || align=right | 1.5 km || 
|-id=449 bgcolor=#d6d6d6
| 501449 ||  || — || November 28, 2013 || Mount Lemmon || Mount Lemmon Survey || EOS || align=right | 2.7 km || 
|-id=450 bgcolor=#E9E9E9
| 501450 ||  || — || September 5, 2008 || Kitt Peak || Spacewatch ||  || align=right | 1.5 km || 
|-id=451 bgcolor=#d6d6d6
| 501451 ||  || — || October 16, 2012 || Mount Lemmon || Mount Lemmon Survey ||  || align=right | 2.2 km || 
|-id=452 bgcolor=#d6d6d6
| 501452 ||  || — || November 8, 2013 || Mount Lemmon || Mount Lemmon Survey ||  || align=right | 3.0 km || 
|-id=453 bgcolor=#d6d6d6
| 501453 ||  || — || January 10, 2008 || Mount Lemmon || Mount Lemmon Survey || 7:4 || align=right | 3.2 km || 
|-id=454 bgcolor=#d6d6d6
| 501454 ||  || — || November 3, 2007 || Mount Lemmon || Mount Lemmon Survey ||  || align=right | 2.3 km || 
|-id=455 bgcolor=#d6d6d6
| 501455 ||  || — || December 1, 2008 || Mount Lemmon || Mount Lemmon Survey || EOS || align=right | 3.6 km || 
|-id=456 bgcolor=#d6d6d6
| 501456 ||  || — || June 6, 2010 || Kitt Peak || Spacewatch ||  || align=right | 3.7 km || 
|-id=457 bgcolor=#E9E9E9
| 501457 ||  || — || December 14, 2004 || Catalina || CSS ||  || align=right | 2.1 km || 
|-id=458 bgcolor=#d6d6d6
| 501458 ||  || — || September 26, 2012 || Haleakala || Pan-STARRS || EOS || align=right | 2.5 km || 
|-id=459 bgcolor=#d6d6d6
| 501459 ||  || — || December 4, 2007 || Mount Lemmon || Mount Lemmon Survey || THM || align=right | 2.0 km || 
|-id=460 bgcolor=#d6d6d6
| 501460 ||  || — || December 30, 2013 || Kitt Peak || Spacewatch || EOS || align=right | 2.7 km || 
|-id=461 bgcolor=#d6d6d6
| 501461 ||  || — || January 29, 2009 || Mount Lemmon || Mount Lemmon Survey || EMA || align=right | 2.7 km || 
|-id=462 bgcolor=#d6d6d6
| 501462 ||  || — || January 25, 2009 || Kitt Peak || Spacewatch ||  || align=right | 2.2 km || 
|-id=463 bgcolor=#d6d6d6
| 501463 ||  || — || September 15, 2012 || Catalina || CSS ||  || align=right | 3.5 km || 
|-id=464 bgcolor=#d6d6d6
| 501464 ||  || — || January 21, 2014 || Kitt Peak || Spacewatch || EOS || align=right | 2.7 km || 
|-id=465 bgcolor=#d6d6d6
| 501465 ||  || — || November 24, 2008 || Kitt Peak || Spacewatch ||  || align=right | 2.6 km || 
|-id=466 bgcolor=#E9E9E9
| 501466 ||  || — || November 1, 2008 || Mount Lemmon || Mount Lemmon Survey || MRX || align=right data-sort-value="0.96" | 960 m || 
|-id=467 bgcolor=#d6d6d6
| 501467 ||  || — || August 23, 2011 || La Sagra || OAM Obs. || EUP || align=right | 3.9 km || 
|-id=468 bgcolor=#d6d6d6
| 501468 ||  || — || October 19, 2012 || Mount Lemmon || Mount Lemmon Survey ||  || align=right | 3.1 km || 
|-id=469 bgcolor=#d6d6d6
| 501469 ||  || — || March 1, 2009 || Kitt Peak || Spacewatch ||  || align=right | 3.0 km || 
|-id=470 bgcolor=#d6d6d6
| 501470 ||  || — || December 15, 2007 || Catalina || CSS ||  || align=right | 3.1 km || 
|-id=471 bgcolor=#d6d6d6
| 501471 ||  || — || September 27, 2006 || Kitt Peak || Spacewatch || EOS || align=right | 1.6 km || 
|-id=472 bgcolor=#d6d6d6
| 501472 ||  || — || August 9, 2011 || Haleakala || Pan-STARRS || EOS || align=right | 3.6 km || 
|-id=473 bgcolor=#d6d6d6
| 501473 ||  || — || January 7, 1998 || Kitt Peak || Spacewatch ||  || align=right | 3.2 km || 
|-id=474 bgcolor=#d6d6d6
| 501474 ||  || — || December 5, 2007 || Kitt Peak || Spacewatch ||  || align=right | 3.2 km || 
|-id=475 bgcolor=#d6d6d6
| 501475 ||  || — || February 24, 2009 || Mount Lemmon || Mount Lemmon Survey ||  || align=right | 2.9 km || 
|-id=476 bgcolor=#d6d6d6
| 501476 ||  || — || January 27, 2003 || Kitt Peak || Spacewatch || URS  ELF || align=right | 3.5 km || 
|-id=477 bgcolor=#d6d6d6
| 501477 ||  || — || December 5, 2007 || Kitt Peak || Spacewatch || EOS || align=right | 2.5 km || 
|-id=478 bgcolor=#d6d6d6
| 501478 ||  || — || December 3, 2008 || Kitt Peak || Spacewatch || EOS || align=right | 2.2 km || 
|-id=479 bgcolor=#fefefe
| 501479 ||  || — || June 11, 2012 || Haleakala || Pan-STARRS || H || align=right data-sort-value="0.83" | 830 m || 
|-id=480 bgcolor=#d6d6d6
| 501480 ||  || — || March 8, 2009 || Mount Lemmon || Mount Lemmon Survey ||  || align=right | 3.7 km || 
|-id=481 bgcolor=#d6d6d6
| 501481 ||  || — || October 7, 2012 || Haleakala || Pan-STARRS ||  || align=right | 2.3 km || 
|-id=482 bgcolor=#d6d6d6
| 501482 ||  || — || October 20, 2012 || Haleakala || Pan-STARRS || EOS || align=right | 3.1 km || 
|-id=483 bgcolor=#d6d6d6
| 501483 ||  || — || March 9, 2003 || Anderson Mesa || LONEOS || EUP || align=right | 6.1 km || 
|-id=484 bgcolor=#d6d6d6
| 501484 ||  || — || November 8, 2007 || Kitt Peak || Spacewatch || 637 || align=right | 2.1 km || 
|-id=485 bgcolor=#d6d6d6
| 501485 ||  || — || January 30, 2009 || Mount Lemmon || Mount Lemmon Survey || EOS || align=right | 2.0 km || 
|-id=486 bgcolor=#d6d6d6
| 501486 ||  || — || October 21, 2007 || Mount Lemmon || Mount Lemmon Survey || HYG || align=right | 2.2 km || 
|-id=487 bgcolor=#d6d6d6
| 501487 ||  || — || January 3, 2014 || Kitt Peak || Spacewatch ||  || align=right | 3.0 km || 
|-id=488 bgcolor=#d6d6d6
| 501488 ||  || — || August 27, 2006 || Kitt Peak || Spacewatch ||  || align=right | 2.8 km || 
|-id=489 bgcolor=#d6d6d6
| 501489 ||  || — || November 7, 2012 || Haleakala || Pan-STARRS ||  || align=right | 2.6 km || 
|-id=490 bgcolor=#d6d6d6
| 501490 ||  || — || October 18, 2012 || Haleakala || Pan-STARRS ||  || align=right | 2.5 km || 
|-id=491 bgcolor=#d6d6d6
| 501491 ||  || — || October 21, 2012 || Haleakala || Pan-STARRS || HYG || align=right | 2.9 km || 
|-id=492 bgcolor=#d6d6d6
| 501492 ||  || — || January 9, 2014 || Mount Lemmon || Mount Lemmon Survey ||  || align=right | 3.0 km || 
|-id=493 bgcolor=#E9E9E9
| 501493 ||  || — || January 18, 2005 || Catalina || CSS ||  || align=right | 1.3 km || 
|-id=494 bgcolor=#d6d6d6
| 501494 ||  || — || November 6, 2013 || Haleakala || Pan-STARRS || LIX || align=right | 2.7 km || 
|-id=495 bgcolor=#d6d6d6
| 501495 ||  || — || October 12, 2013 || Mount Lemmon || Mount Lemmon Survey ||  || align=right | 3.0 km || 
|-id=496 bgcolor=#d6d6d6
| 501496 ||  || — || January 28, 2014 || Kitt Peak || Spacewatch ||  || align=right | 3.0 km || 
|-id=497 bgcolor=#d6d6d6
| 501497 ||  || — || December 17, 2007 || Catalina || CSS || TIR || align=right | 2.7 km || 
|-id=498 bgcolor=#d6d6d6
| 501498 ||  || — || January 7, 2014 || Mount Lemmon || Mount Lemmon Survey ||  || align=right | 3.3 km || 
|-id=499 bgcolor=#d6d6d6
| 501499 ||  || — || March 21, 2009 || Kitt Peak || Spacewatch || HYG || align=right | 2.4 km || 
|-id=500 bgcolor=#d6d6d6
| 501500 ||  || — || March 17, 2004 || Kitt Peak || Spacewatch ||  || align=right | 2.0 km || 
|}

501501–501600 

|-bgcolor=#d6d6d6
| 501501 ||  || — || January 18, 2008 || Mount Lemmon || Mount Lemmon Survey || EUP || align=right | 3.8 km || 
|-id=502 bgcolor=#d6d6d6
| 501502 ||  || — || December 17, 2007 || Kitt Peak || Spacewatch || THM || align=right | 1.9 km || 
|-id=503 bgcolor=#d6d6d6
| 501503 ||  || — || October 9, 2007 || Catalina || CSS ||  || align=right | 2.7 km || 
|-id=504 bgcolor=#d6d6d6
| 501504 ||  || — || October 20, 2012 || Haleakala || Pan-STARRS ||  || align=right | 2.5 km || 
|-id=505 bgcolor=#d6d6d6
| 501505 ||  || — || February 26, 2014 || Haleakala || Pan-STARRS ||  || align=right | 2.7 km || 
|-id=506 bgcolor=#d6d6d6
| 501506 ||  || — || August 27, 2011 || Haleakala || Pan-STARRS ||  || align=right | 2.8 km || 
|-id=507 bgcolor=#d6d6d6
| 501507 ||  || — || February 26, 2014 || Haleakala || Pan-STARRS ||  || align=right | 3.0 km || 
|-id=508 bgcolor=#d6d6d6
| 501508 ||  || — || July 28, 2011 || Haleakala || Pan-STARRS ||  || align=right | 2.4 km || 
|-id=509 bgcolor=#d6d6d6
| 501509 ||  || — || February 2, 2008 || Mount Lemmon || Mount Lemmon Survey ||  || align=right | 2.7 km || 
|-id=510 bgcolor=#d6d6d6
| 501510 ||  || — || September 22, 2006 || Anderson Mesa || LONEOS ||  || align=right | 3.5 km || 
|-id=511 bgcolor=#d6d6d6
| 501511 ||  || — || September 4, 2011 || Haleakala || Pan-STARRS ||  || align=right | 3.0 km || 
|-id=512 bgcolor=#d6d6d6
| 501512 ||  || — || September 26, 2011 || Mount Lemmon || Mount Lemmon Survey || EOS || align=right | 2.9 km || 
|-id=513 bgcolor=#E9E9E9
| 501513 ||  || — || March 4, 2005 || Kitt Peak || Spacewatch ||  || align=right | 2.1 km || 
|-id=514 bgcolor=#d6d6d6
| 501514 ||  || — || August 28, 2011 || Haleakala || Pan-STARRS || EOS || align=right | 2.1 km || 
|-id=515 bgcolor=#d6d6d6
| 501515 ||  || — || August 23, 2011 || Haleakala || Pan-STARRS || EOS || align=right | 1.9 km || 
|-id=516 bgcolor=#d6d6d6
| 501516 ||  || — || February 19, 2009 || Kitt Peak || Spacewatch ||  || align=right | 2.1 km || 
|-id=517 bgcolor=#d6d6d6
| 501517 ||  || — || August 30, 2002 || Kitt Peak || Spacewatch || TRP || align=right | 2.0 km || 
|-id=518 bgcolor=#d6d6d6
| 501518 ||  || — || August 23, 2011 || Haleakala || Pan-STARRS || EOS || align=right | 1.5 km || 
|-id=519 bgcolor=#d6d6d6
| 501519 ||  || — || February 28, 2014 || Haleakala || Pan-STARRS || VER || align=right | 2.7 km || 
|-id=520 bgcolor=#d6d6d6
| 501520 ||  || — || April 13, 2004 || Kitt Peak || Spacewatch ||  || align=right | 2.2 km || 
|-id=521 bgcolor=#d6d6d6
| 501521 ||  || — || February 9, 2014 || Kitt Peak || Spacewatch ||  || align=right | 2.7 km || 
|-id=522 bgcolor=#d6d6d6
| 501522 ||  || — || December 16, 2007 || Kitt Peak || Spacewatch ||  || align=right | 2.3 km || 
|-id=523 bgcolor=#d6d6d6
| 501523 ||  || — || September 26, 2011 || Haleakala || Pan-STARRS || EOS || align=right | 2.0 km || 
|-id=524 bgcolor=#d6d6d6
| 501524 ||  || — || December 9, 2012 || Haleakala || Pan-STARRS ||  || align=right | 2.8 km || 
|-id=525 bgcolor=#d6d6d6
| 501525 ||  || — || September 4, 2011 || Haleakala || Pan-STARRS ||  || align=right | 3.9 km || 
|-id=526 bgcolor=#d6d6d6
| 501526 ||  || — || February 20, 2014 || Haleakala || Pan-STARRS ||  || align=right | 3.6 km || 
|-id=527 bgcolor=#d6d6d6
| 501527 ||  || — || January 22, 2002 || Kitt Peak || Spacewatch ||  || align=right | 2.5 km || 
|-id=528 bgcolor=#d6d6d6
| 501528 ||  || — || July 28, 2011 || Haleakala || Pan-STARRS ||  || align=right | 2.9 km || 
|-id=529 bgcolor=#d6d6d6
| 501529 ||  || — || January 18, 2008 || Mount Lemmon || Mount Lemmon Survey ||  || align=right | 2.8 km || 
|-id=530 bgcolor=#d6d6d6
| 501530 ||  || — || March 24, 2003 || Kitt Peak || Spacewatch || TIR || align=right | 2.6 km || 
|-id=531 bgcolor=#d6d6d6
| 501531 ||  || — || October 6, 2012 || Haleakala || Pan-STARRS || LUT || align=right | 4.1 km || 
|-id=532 bgcolor=#d6d6d6
| 501532 ||  || — || April 26, 2009 || Mount Lemmon || Mount Lemmon Survey ||  || align=right | 2.7 km || 
|-id=533 bgcolor=#d6d6d6
| 501533 ||  || — || March 24, 2003 || Kitt Peak || Spacewatch ||  || align=right | 2.5 km || 
|-id=534 bgcolor=#d6d6d6
| 501534 ||  || — || March 11, 2008 || XuYi || PMO NEO ||  || align=right | 3.8 km || 
|-id=535 bgcolor=#d6d6d6
| 501535 ||  || — || September 24, 2011 || Haleakala || Pan-STARRS || TIR || align=right | 3.0 km || 
|-id=536 bgcolor=#d6d6d6
| 501536 ||  || — || February 13, 2008 || Mount Lemmon || Mount Lemmon Survey ||  || align=right | 2.3 km || 
|-id=537 bgcolor=#d6d6d6
| 501537 ||  || — || November 5, 2011 || Haleakala || Pan-STARRS || EOS || align=right | 2.2 km || 
|-id=538 bgcolor=#d6d6d6
| 501538 ||  || — || April 4, 2014 || Haleakala || Pan-STARRS ||  || align=right | 3.6 km || 
|-id=539 bgcolor=#E9E9E9
| 501539 ||  || — || October 25, 2011 || Haleakala || Pan-STARRS ||  || align=right | 3.0 km || 
|-id=540 bgcolor=#fefefe
| 501540 ||  || — || August 5, 2012 || Haleakala || Pan-STARRS || H || align=right data-sort-value="0.96" | 960 m || 
|-id=541 bgcolor=#E9E9E9
| 501541 ||  || — || March 1, 2009 || Kitt Peak || Spacewatch || AGN || align=right | 1.8 km || 
|-id=542 bgcolor=#fefefe
| 501542 ||  || — || April 10, 2014 || Haleakala || Pan-STARRS || H || align=right data-sort-value="0.65" | 650 m || 
|-id=543 bgcolor=#fefefe
| 501543 ||  || — || January 30, 2011 || Mount Lemmon || Mount Lemmon Survey || H || align=right data-sort-value="0.64" | 640 m || 
|-id=544 bgcolor=#fefefe
| 501544 ||  || — || September 15, 2012 || Kitt Peak || Spacewatch || H || align=right data-sort-value="0.63" | 630 m || 
|-id=545 bgcolor=#d6d6d6
| 501545 ||  || — || February 28, 2014 || Haleakala || Pan-STARRS || EOS || align=right | 3.2 km || 
|-id=546 bgcolor=#C2E0FF
| 501546 ||  || — || July 9, 2013 || Haleakala || Pan-STARRS || other TNOcritical || align=right | 312 km || 
|-id=547 bgcolor=#fefefe
| 501547 ||  || — || March 17, 2004 || Kitt Peak || Spacewatch || H || align=right data-sort-value="0.46" | 460 m || 
|-id=548 bgcolor=#E9E9E9
| 501548 ||  || — || January 20, 2009 || Mount Lemmon || Mount Lemmon Survey ||  || align=right | 1.4 km || 
|-id=549 bgcolor=#fefefe
| 501549 ||  || — || October 17, 2012 || Haleakala || Pan-STARRS || H || align=right data-sort-value="0.53" | 530 m || 
|-id=550 bgcolor=#fefefe
| 501550 ||  || — || April 22, 2014 || Mount Lemmon || Mount Lemmon Survey || H || align=right data-sort-value="0.67" | 670 m || 
|-id=551 bgcolor=#FA8072
| 501551 ||  || — || March 5, 2006 || Kitt Peak || Spacewatch || H || align=right data-sort-value="0.59" | 590 m || 
|-id=552 bgcolor=#fefefe
| 501552 ||  || — || October 13, 2012 || Haleakala || Pan-STARRS || H || align=right data-sort-value="0.62" | 620 m || 
|-id=553 bgcolor=#fefefe
| 501553 ||  || — || June 2, 2014 || Haleakala || Pan-STARRS ||  || align=right data-sort-value="0.64" | 640 m || 
|-id=554 bgcolor=#fefefe
| 501554 ||  || — || June 6, 2014 || Haleakala || Pan-STARRS || H || align=right data-sort-value="0.60" | 600 m || 
|-id=555 bgcolor=#fefefe
| 501555 ||  || — || June 9, 2014 || Mount Lemmon || Mount Lemmon Survey || H || align=right data-sort-value="0.59" | 590 m || 
|-id=556 bgcolor=#fefefe
| 501556 ||  || — || September 21, 2004 || Socorro || LINEAR || H || align=right data-sort-value="0.65" | 650 m || 
|-id=557 bgcolor=#fefefe
| 501557 ||  || — || January 30, 2011 || Catalina || CSS || H || align=right data-sort-value="0.72" | 720 m || 
|-id=558 bgcolor=#fefefe
| 501558 ||  || — || February 28, 2011 || La Sagra || OAM Obs. || H || align=right data-sort-value="0.54" | 540 m || 
|-id=559 bgcolor=#fefefe
| 501559 ||  || — || April 25, 2011 || Mount Lemmon || Mount Lemmon Survey || H || align=right data-sort-value="0.82" | 820 m || 
|-id=560 bgcolor=#fefefe
| 501560 ||  || — || January 16, 2009 || Kitt Peak || Spacewatch ||  || align=right data-sort-value="0.73" | 730 m || 
|-id=561 bgcolor=#fefefe
| 501561 ||  || — || June 26, 2014 || Haleakala || Pan-STARRS ||  || align=right data-sort-value="0.65" | 650 m || 
|-id=562 bgcolor=#fefefe
| 501562 ||  || — || February 6, 2008 || Catalina || CSS || H || align=right data-sort-value="0.60" | 600 m || 
|-id=563 bgcolor=#fefefe
| 501563 ||  || — || July 2, 2014 || Kitt Peak || Spacewatch || H || align=right data-sort-value="0.62" | 620 m || 
|-id=564 bgcolor=#fefefe
| 501564 ||  || — || May 7, 2014 || Haleakala || Pan-STARRS ||  || align=right data-sort-value="0.59" | 590 m || 
|-id=565 bgcolor=#fefefe
| 501565 ||  || — || May 24, 2011 || Haleakala || Pan-STARRS || H || align=right data-sort-value="0.72" | 720 m || 
|-id=566 bgcolor=#fefefe
| 501566 ||  || — || June 20, 2014 || Haleakala || Pan-STARRS || H || align=right data-sort-value="0.50" | 500 m || 
|-id=567 bgcolor=#FFC2E0
| 501567 ||  || — || March 30, 2011 || Mount Lemmon || Mount Lemmon Survey || AMOcritical || align=right data-sort-value="0.22" | 220 m || 
|-id=568 bgcolor=#fefefe
| 501568 ||  || — || May 9, 2014 || Haleakala || Pan-STARRS || H || align=right data-sort-value="0.80" | 800 m || 
|-id=569 bgcolor=#fefefe
| 501569 ||  || — || January 16, 2013 || Haleakala || Pan-STARRS ||  || align=right data-sort-value="0.57" | 570 m || 
|-id=570 bgcolor=#fefefe
| 501570 ||  || — || June 19, 2010 || Mount Lemmon || Mount Lemmon Survey ||  || align=right | 2.0 km || 
|-id=571 bgcolor=#fefefe
| 501571 ||  || — || January 18, 2013 || Haleakala || Pan-STARRS || H || align=right data-sort-value="0.90" | 900 m || 
|-id=572 bgcolor=#fefefe
| 501572 ||  || — || July 25, 2014 || Haleakala || Pan-STARRS || V || align=right data-sort-value="0.52" | 520 m || 
|-id=573 bgcolor=#fefefe
| 501573 ||  || — || February 27, 2006 || Kitt Peak || Spacewatch || NYS || align=right data-sort-value="0.60" | 600 m || 
|-id=574 bgcolor=#fefefe
| 501574 ||  || — || October 25, 2011 || Haleakala || Pan-STARRS ||  || align=right data-sort-value="0.61" | 610 m || 
|-id=575 bgcolor=#FA8072
| 501575 ||  || — || August 31, 2011 || Haleakala || Pan-STARRS ||  || align=right data-sort-value="0.33" | 330 m || 
|-id=576 bgcolor=#fefefe
| 501576 ||  || — || March 25, 2010 || Kitt Peak || Spacewatch ||  || align=right data-sort-value="0.60" | 600 m || 
|-id=577 bgcolor=#fefefe
| 501577 ||  || — || May 19, 2010 || Mount Lemmon || Mount Lemmon Survey ||  || align=right data-sort-value="0.67" | 670 m || 
|-id=578 bgcolor=#fefefe
| 501578 ||  || — || December 25, 2011 || Mount Lemmon || Mount Lemmon Survey ||  || align=right data-sort-value="0.65" | 650 m || 
|-id=579 bgcolor=#fefefe
| 501579 ||  || — || December 23, 2012 || Haleakala || Pan-STARRS || H || align=right data-sort-value="0.54" | 540 m || 
|-id=580 bgcolor=#fefefe
| 501580 ||  || — || July 29, 2014 || Haleakala || Pan-STARRS || H || align=right data-sort-value="0.50" | 500 m || 
|-id=581 bgcolor=#C2E0FF
| 501581 ||  || — || August 25, 2012 || Haleakala || Pan-STARRS || SDO || align=right | 236 km || 
|-id=582 bgcolor=#fefefe
| 501582 ||  || — || June 5, 2014 || Haleakala || Pan-STARRS ||  || align=right data-sort-value="0.50" | 500 m || 
|-id=583 bgcolor=#fefefe
| 501583 ||  || — || June 22, 2014 || Mount Lemmon || Mount Lemmon Survey || H || align=right data-sort-value="0.46" | 460 m || 
|-id=584 bgcolor=#fefefe
| 501584 ||  || — || August 18, 2014 || Haleakala || Pan-STARRS ||  || align=right data-sort-value="0.73" | 730 m || 
|-id=585 bgcolor=#C7FF8F
| 501585 ||  || — || April 10, 2014 || Haleakala || Pan-STARRS || unusual || align=right | 22 km || 
|-id=586 bgcolor=#fefefe
| 501586 ||  || — || September 4, 2011 || Haleakala || Pan-STARRS ||  || align=right data-sort-value="0.43" | 430 m || 
|-id=587 bgcolor=#fefefe
| 501587 ||  || — || May 3, 2003 || Kitt Peak || Spacewatch ||  || align=right data-sort-value="0.67" | 670 m || 
|-id=588 bgcolor=#E9E9E9
| 501588 ||  || — || August 20, 2014 || Haleakala || Pan-STARRS ||  || align=right | 1.5 km || 
|-id=589 bgcolor=#fefefe
| 501589 ||  || — || September 23, 2011 || Haleakala || Pan-STARRS ||  || align=right data-sort-value="0.39" | 390 m || 
|-id=590 bgcolor=#E9E9E9
| 501590 ||  || — || January 19, 2012 || Haleakala || Pan-STARRS || HNS || align=right | 1.5 km || 
|-id=591 bgcolor=#fefefe
| 501591 ||  || — || February 10, 2010 || Kitt Peak || Spacewatch || H || align=right data-sort-value="0.67" | 670 m || 
|-id=592 bgcolor=#fefefe
| 501592 ||  || — || June 30, 2014 || Haleakala || Pan-STARRS ||  || align=right data-sort-value="0.88" | 880 m || 
|-id=593 bgcolor=#fefefe
| 501593 ||  || — || December 4, 2007 || Catalina || CSS ||  || align=right data-sort-value="0.94" | 940 m || 
|-id=594 bgcolor=#fefefe
| 501594 ||  || — || August 3, 2014 || Haleakala || Pan-STARRS ||  || align=right data-sort-value="0.56" | 560 m || 
|-id=595 bgcolor=#fefefe
| 501595 ||  || — || September 22, 2008 || Kitt Peak || Spacewatch ||  || align=right data-sort-value="0.37" | 370 m || 
|-id=596 bgcolor=#fefefe
| 501596 ||  || — || January 16, 2009 || Mount Lemmon || Mount Lemmon Survey ||  || align=right data-sort-value="0.47" | 470 m || 
|-id=597 bgcolor=#fefefe
| 501597 ||  || — || October 25, 2011 || Haleakala || Pan-STARRS ||  || align=right data-sort-value="0.49" | 490 m || 
|-id=598 bgcolor=#fefefe
| 501598 ||  || — || October 24, 2011 || Mount Lemmon || Mount Lemmon Survey ||  || align=right data-sort-value="0.49" | 490 m || 
|-id=599 bgcolor=#fefefe
| 501599 ||  || — || February 25, 2006 || Kitt Peak || Spacewatch ||  || align=right data-sort-value="0.69" | 690 m || 
|-id=600 bgcolor=#fefefe
| 501600 ||  || — || February 9, 2013 || Haleakala || Pan-STARRS ||  || align=right data-sort-value="0.62" | 620 m || 
|}

501601–501700 

|-bgcolor=#fefefe
| 501601 ||  || — || October 18, 2011 || Kitt Peak || Spacewatch ||  || align=right data-sort-value="0.58" | 580 m || 
|-id=602 bgcolor=#fefefe
| 501602 ||  || — || October 30, 2007 || Catalina || CSS || MAS || align=right data-sort-value="0.69" | 690 m || 
|-id=603 bgcolor=#fefefe
| 501603 ||  || — || October 25, 2011 || Haleakala || Pan-STARRS ||  || align=right data-sort-value="0.63" | 630 m || 
|-id=604 bgcolor=#fefefe
| 501604 ||  || — || December 16, 2004 || Kitt Peak || Spacewatch ||  || align=right data-sort-value="0.69" | 690 m || 
|-id=605 bgcolor=#fefefe
| 501605 ||  || — || March 11, 2005 || Kitt Peak || Spacewatch ||  || align=right data-sort-value="0.85" | 850 m || 
|-id=606 bgcolor=#FA8072
| 501606 ||  || — || September 27, 2011 || Mount Lemmon || Mount Lemmon Survey ||  || align=right data-sort-value="0.51" | 510 m || 
|-id=607 bgcolor=#fefefe
| 501607 ||  || — || May 5, 2010 || Mount Lemmon || Mount Lemmon Survey ||  || align=right data-sort-value="0.59" | 590 m || 
|-id=608 bgcolor=#fefefe
| 501608 ||  || — || January 14, 2013 || Catalina || CSS || H || align=right data-sort-value="0.66" | 660 m || 
|-id=609 bgcolor=#fefefe
| 501609 ||  || — || October 25, 2011 || Haleakala || Pan-STARRS ||  || align=right data-sort-value="0.67" | 670 m || 
|-id=610 bgcolor=#E9E9E9
| 501610 ||  || — || April 10, 2013 || Mount Lemmon || Mount Lemmon Survey || MAR || align=right | 1.5 km || 
|-id=611 bgcolor=#fefefe
| 501611 ||  || — || February 7, 2008 || Kitt Peak || Spacewatch || SUL || align=right data-sort-value="0.85" | 850 m || 
|-id=612 bgcolor=#FA8072
| 501612 ||  || — || December 20, 2004 || Anderson Mesa || LONEOS ||  || align=right data-sort-value="0.75" | 750 m || 
|-id=613 bgcolor=#fefefe
| 501613 ||  || — || September 15, 2014 || Catalina || CSS || H || align=right data-sort-value="0.65" | 650 m || 
|-id=614 bgcolor=#fefefe
| 501614 ||  || — || July 18, 2007 || Mount Lemmon || Mount Lemmon Survey ||  || align=right data-sort-value="0.72" | 720 m || 
|-id=615 bgcolor=#fefefe
| 501615 ||  || — || January 22, 2006 || Mount Lemmon || Mount Lemmon Survey ||  || align=right data-sort-value="0.49" | 490 m || 
|-id=616 bgcolor=#fefefe
| 501616 ||  || — || October 13, 2007 || Mount Lemmon || Mount Lemmon Survey ||  || align=right data-sort-value="0.65" | 650 m || 
|-id=617 bgcolor=#fefefe
| 501617 ||  || — || August 23, 2014 || Haleakala || Pan-STARRS ||  || align=right data-sort-value="0.51" | 510 m || 
|-id=618 bgcolor=#fefefe
| 501618 ||  || — || July 27, 2014 || Haleakala || Pan-STARRS ||  || align=right data-sort-value="0.57" | 570 m || 
|-id=619 bgcolor=#fefefe
| 501619 ||  || — || October 26, 2005 || Kitt Peak || Spacewatch || critical || align=right data-sort-value="0.41" | 410 m || 
|-id=620 bgcolor=#fefefe
| 501620 ||  || — || December 18, 2009 || Mount Lemmon || Mount Lemmon Survey || H || align=right data-sort-value="0.79" | 790 m || 
|-id=621 bgcolor=#FA8072
| 501621 ||  || — || March 10, 2007 || Mount Lemmon || Mount Lemmon Survey ||  || align=right data-sort-value="0.59" | 590 m || 
|-id=622 bgcolor=#fefefe
| 501622 ||  || — || September 5, 2007 || Catalina || CSS ||  || align=right data-sort-value="0.70" | 700 m || 
|-id=623 bgcolor=#fefefe
| 501623 ||  || — || September 14, 2007 || Mount Lemmon || Mount Lemmon Survey ||  || align=right data-sort-value="0.73" | 730 m || 
|-id=624 bgcolor=#fefefe
| 501624 ||  || — || October 7, 2004 || Kitt Peak || Spacewatch ||  || align=right data-sort-value="0.49" | 490 m || 
|-id=625 bgcolor=#fefefe
| 501625 ||  || — || October 26, 2011 || Haleakala || Pan-STARRS ||  || align=right data-sort-value="0.63" | 630 m || 
|-id=626 bgcolor=#fefefe
| 501626 ||  || — || April 8, 2013 || Mount Lemmon || Mount Lemmon Survey ||  || align=right data-sort-value="0.48" | 480 m || 
|-id=627 bgcolor=#fefefe
| 501627 ||  || — || October 24, 2011 || Kitt Peak || Spacewatch ||  || align=right data-sort-value="0.68" | 680 m || 
|-id=628 bgcolor=#fefefe
| 501628 ||  || — || September 12, 2007 || Mount Lemmon || Mount Lemmon Survey ||  || align=right data-sort-value="0.62" | 620 m || 
|-id=629 bgcolor=#E9E9E9
| 501629 ||  || — || April 8, 2008 || Kitt Peak || Spacewatch ||  || align=right | 1.0 km || 
|-id=630 bgcolor=#fefefe
| 501630 ||  || — || August 10, 2007 || Kitt Peak || Spacewatch ||  || align=right data-sort-value="0.66" | 660 m || 
|-id=631 bgcolor=#fefefe
| 501631 ||  || — || December 20, 2004 || Mount Lemmon || Mount Lemmon Survey ||  || align=right data-sort-value="0.89" | 890 m || 
|-id=632 bgcolor=#fefefe
| 501632 ||  || — || January 18, 2012 || Mount Lemmon || Mount Lemmon Survey ||  || align=right data-sort-value="0.69" | 690 m || 
|-id=633 bgcolor=#E9E9E9
| 501633 ||  || — || July 12, 2013 || Haleakala || Pan-STARRS || WIT || align=right | 1.7 km || 
|-id=634 bgcolor=#fefefe
| 501634 ||  || — || June 22, 2010 || WISE || WISE || SVE || align=right | 2.0 km || 
|-id=635 bgcolor=#E9E9E9
| 501635 ||  || — || December 13, 2010 || Mount Lemmon || Mount Lemmon Survey ||  || align=right | 1.9 km || 
|-id=636 bgcolor=#fefefe
| 501636 ||  || — || September 4, 2014 || Haleakala || Pan-STARRS ||  || align=right data-sort-value="0.66" | 660 m || 
|-id=637 bgcolor=#fefefe
| 501637 ||  || — || April 19, 2012 || Kitt Peak || Spacewatch ||  || align=right data-sort-value="0.83" | 830 m || 
|-id=638 bgcolor=#fefefe
| 501638 ||  || — || October 7, 2004 || Socorro || LINEAR ||  || align=right data-sort-value="0.73" | 730 m || 
|-id=639 bgcolor=#fefefe
| 501639 ||  || — || February 2, 2005 || Kitt Peak || Spacewatch || V || align=right data-sort-value="0.70" | 700 m || 
|-id=640 bgcolor=#fefefe
| 501640 ||  || — || January 1, 2009 || Mount Lemmon || Mount Lemmon Survey ||  || align=right data-sort-value="0.93" | 930 m || 
|-id=641 bgcolor=#E9E9E9
| 501641 ||  || — || April 27, 2012 || Haleakala || Pan-STARRS ||  || align=right | 2.5 km || 
|-id=642 bgcolor=#fefefe
| 501642 ||  || — || September 12, 2007 || Catalina || CSS ||  || align=right data-sort-value="0.80" | 800 m || 
|-id=643 bgcolor=#fefefe
| 501643 ||  || — || September 28, 1994 || Kitt Peak || Spacewatch ||  || align=right data-sort-value="0.71" | 710 m || 
|-id=644 bgcolor=#fefefe
| 501644 ||  || — || December 15, 2007 || Mount Lemmon || Mount Lemmon Survey || V || align=right data-sort-value="0.57" | 570 m || 
|-id=645 bgcolor=#fefefe
| 501645 ||  || — || January 16, 2009 || Kitt Peak || Spacewatch ||  || align=right data-sort-value="0.73" | 730 m || 
|-id=646 bgcolor=#FA8072
| 501646 ||  || — || October 17, 1998 || Kitt Peak || Spacewatch ||  || align=right data-sort-value="0.65" | 650 m || 
|-id=647 bgcolor=#FFC2E0
| 501647 ||  || — || September 22, 2014 || Haleakala || Pan-STARRS || ATE || align=right data-sort-value="0.12" | 120 m || 
|-id=648 bgcolor=#fefefe
| 501648 ||  || — || March 19, 2013 || Haleakala || Pan-STARRS || NYS || align=right data-sort-value="0.71" | 710 m || 
|-id=649 bgcolor=#fefefe
| 501649 ||  || — || March 16, 2009 || Kitt Peak || Spacewatch ||  || align=right data-sort-value="0.86" | 860 m || 
|-id=650 bgcolor=#fefefe
| 501650 ||  || — || March 13, 2010 || Mount Lemmon || Mount Lemmon Survey ||  || align=right data-sort-value="0.49" | 490 m || 
|-id=651 bgcolor=#fefefe
| 501651 ||  || — || October 9, 2007 || Kitt Peak || Spacewatch ||  || align=right data-sort-value="0.91" | 910 m || 
|-id=652 bgcolor=#fefefe
| 501652 ||  || — || February 2, 2006 || Catalina || CSS ||  || align=right data-sort-value="0.82" | 820 m || 
|-id=653 bgcolor=#fefefe
| 501653 ||  || — || August 27, 2014 || Haleakala || Pan-STARRS ||  || align=right data-sort-value="0.54" | 540 m || 
|-id=654 bgcolor=#fefefe
| 501654 ||  || — || October 8, 2004 || Kitt Peak || Spacewatch ||  || align=right data-sort-value="0.90" | 900 m || 
|-id=655 bgcolor=#fefefe
| 501655 ||  || — || February 3, 2008 || Mount Lemmon || Mount Lemmon Survey || V || align=right data-sort-value="0.54" | 540 m || 
|-id=656 bgcolor=#fefefe
| 501656 ||  || — || August 28, 2014 || Haleakala || Pan-STARRS ||  || align=right data-sort-value="0.59" | 590 m || 
|-id=657 bgcolor=#fefefe
| 501657 ||  || — || September 19, 2001 || Socorro || LINEAR ||  || align=right data-sort-value="0.52" | 520 m || 
|-id=658 bgcolor=#fefefe
| 501658 ||  || — || November 3, 2007 || Kitt Peak || Spacewatch ||  || align=right data-sort-value="0.59" | 590 m || 
|-id=659 bgcolor=#fefefe
| 501659 ||  || — || October 15, 2007 || Mount Lemmon || Mount Lemmon Survey ||  || align=right data-sort-value="0.90" | 900 m || 
|-id=660 bgcolor=#fefefe
| 501660 ||  || — || May 11, 2007 || Mount Lemmon || Mount Lemmon Survey ||  || align=right data-sort-value="0.54" | 540 m || 
|-id=661 bgcolor=#fefefe
| 501661 ||  || — || September 21, 2003 || Kitt Peak || Spacewatch ||  || align=right data-sort-value="0.60" | 600 m || 
|-id=662 bgcolor=#fefefe
| 501662 ||  || — || September 2, 2014 || Haleakala || Pan-STARRS ||  || align=right data-sort-value="0.54" | 540 m || 
|-id=663 bgcolor=#fefefe
| 501663 ||  || — || September 2, 2014 || Haleakala || Pan-STARRS ||  || align=right data-sort-value="0.55" | 550 m || 
|-id=664 bgcolor=#fefefe
| 501664 ||  || — || September 2, 2014 || Haleakala || Pan-STARRS ||  || align=right data-sort-value="0.67" | 670 m || 
|-id=665 bgcolor=#FA8072
| 501665 ||  || — || September 24, 2011 || Mount Lemmon || Mount Lemmon Survey ||  || align=right data-sort-value="0.47" | 470 m || 
|-id=666 bgcolor=#fefefe
| 501666 ||  || — || January 20, 2012 || Mount Lemmon || Mount Lemmon Survey ||  || align=right data-sort-value="0.51" | 510 m || 
|-id=667 bgcolor=#fefefe
| 501667 ||  || — || October 8, 2004 || Kitt Peak || Spacewatch ||  || align=right data-sort-value="0.64" | 640 m || 
|-id=668 bgcolor=#fefefe
| 501668 ||  || — || October 10, 2004 || Kitt Peak || Spacewatch ||  || align=right data-sort-value="0.83" | 830 m || 
|-id=669 bgcolor=#fefefe
| 501669 ||  || — || November 2, 2007 || Kitt Peak || Spacewatch ||  || align=right data-sort-value="0.75" | 750 m || 
|-id=670 bgcolor=#fefefe
| 501670 ||  || — || November 27, 2011 || Mount Lemmon || Mount Lemmon Survey ||  || align=right data-sort-value="0.58" | 580 m || 
|-id=671 bgcolor=#fefefe
| 501671 ||  || — || January 21, 2012 || Kitt Peak || Spacewatch ||  || align=right data-sort-value="0.73" | 730 m || 
|-id=672 bgcolor=#fefefe
| 501672 ||  || — || September 30, 2003 || Kitt Peak || Spacewatch ||  || align=right data-sort-value="0.86" | 860 m || 
|-id=673 bgcolor=#fefefe
| 501673 ||  || — || December 6, 2011 || Haleakala || Pan-STARRS ||  || align=right data-sort-value="0.77" | 770 m || 
|-id=674 bgcolor=#fefefe
| 501674 ||  || — || December 31, 2008 || Kitt Peak || Spacewatch ||  || align=right data-sort-value="0.52" | 520 m || 
|-id=675 bgcolor=#fefefe
| 501675 ||  || — || November 18, 2003 || Kitt Peak || Spacewatch || MAS || align=right data-sort-value="0.85" | 850 m || 
|-id=676 bgcolor=#fefefe
| 501676 ||  || — || September 20, 2014 || Catalina || CSS || H || align=right data-sort-value="0.58" | 580 m || 
|-id=677 bgcolor=#fefefe
| 501677 ||  || — || October 9, 2004 || Kitt Peak || Spacewatch ||  || align=right data-sort-value="0.59" | 590 m || 
|-id=678 bgcolor=#fefefe
| 501678 ||  || — || October 13, 2004 || Kitt Peak || Spacewatch ||  || align=right data-sort-value="0.48" | 480 m || 
|-id=679 bgcolor=#fefefe
| 501679 ||  || — || August 31, 2014 || Haleakala || Pan-STARRS || EUT || align=right data-sort-value="0.68" | 680 m || 
|-id=680 bgcolor=#fefefe
| 501680 ||  || — || October 30, 2007 || Kitt Peak || Spacewatch ||  || align=right data-sort-value="0.84" | 840 m || 
|-id=681 bgcolor=#fefefe
| 501681 ||  || — || September 10, 2007 || Mount Lemmon || Mount Lemmon Survey ||  || align=right data-sort-value="0.50" | 500 m || 
|-id=682 bgcolor=#fefefe
| 501682 ||  || — || January 21, 2012 || Haleakala || Pan-STARRS ||  || align=right data-sort-value="0.77" | 770 m || 
|-id=683 bgcolor=#fefefe
| 501683 ||  || — || October 14, 2014 || Kitt Peak || Spacewatch ||  || align=right data-sort-value="0.72" | 720 m || 
|-id=684 bgcolor=#fefefe
| 501684 ||  || — || September 20, 2014 || Haleakala || Pan-STARRS ||  || align=right data-sort-value="0.54" | 540 m || 
|-id=685 bgcolor=#fefefe
| 501685 ||  || — || October 15, 2007 || Mount Lemmon || Mount Lemmon Survey ||  || align=right data-sort-value="0.67" | 670 m || 
|-id=686 bgcolor=#E9E9E9
| 501686 ||  || — || October 13, 2014 || Kitt Peak || Spacewatch ||  || align=right | 1.8 km || 
|-id=687 bgcolor=#fefefe
| 501687 ||  || — || September 19, 2007 || Kitt Peak || Spacewatch ||  || align=right data-sort-value="0.51" | 510 m || 
|-id=688 bgcolor=#fefefe
| 501688 ||  || — || September 26, 1998 || Socorro || LINEAR ||  || align=right data-sort-value="0.82" | 820 m || 
|-id=689 bgcolor=#fefefe
| 501689 ||  || — || January 23, 2006 || Kitt Peak || Spacewatch ||  || align=right data-sort-value="0.71" | 710 m || 
|-id=690 bgcolor=#fefefe
| 501690 ||  || — || February 2, 2005 || Kitt Peak || Spacewatch ||  || align=right data-sort-value="0.66" | 660 m || 
|-id=691 bgcolor=#FA8072
| 501691 ||  || — || April 5, 2010 || Kitt Peak || Spacewatch ||  || align=right data-sort-value="0.75" | 750 m || 
|-id=692 bgcolor=#fefefe
| 501692 ||  || — || January 2, 2001 || Socorro || LINEAR ||  || align=right data-sort-value="0.74" | 740 m || 
|-id=693 bgcolor=#fefefe
| 501693 ||  || — || November 2, 2007 || Mount Lemmon || Mount Lemmon Survey ||  || align=right data-sort-value="0.61" | 610 m || 
|-id=694 bgcolor=#fefefe
| 501694 ||  || — || September 9, 2004 || Kitt Peak || Spacewatch ||  || align=right data-sort-value="0.67" | 670 m || 
|-id=695 bgcolor=#fefefe
| 501695 ||  || — || February 28, 2009 || Kitt Peak || Spacewatch ||  || align=right | 1.0 km || 
|-id=696 bgcolor=#fefefe
| 501696 ||  || — || October 8, 2007 || Mount Lemmon || Mount Lemmon Survey ||  || align=right data-sort-value="0.61" | 610 m || 
|-id=697 bgcolor=#fefefe
| 501697 ||  || — || December 30, 2011 || Kitt Peak || Spacewatch ||  || align=right data-sort-value="0.59" | 590 m || 
|-id=698 bgcolor=#fefefe
| 501698 ||  || — || December 20, 2004 || Mount Lemmon || Mount Lemmon Survey ||  || align=right data-sort-value="0.62" | 620 m || 
|-id=699 bgcolor=#d6d6d6
| 501699 ||  || — || January 12, 2010 || WISE || WISE ||  || align=right | 2.3 km || 
|-id=700 bgcolor=#fefefe
| 501700 ||  || — || January 2, 2012 || Kitt Peak || Spacewatch ||  || align=right data-sort-value="0.56" | 560 m || 
|}

501701–501800 

|-bgcolor=#fefefe
| 501701 ||  || — || January 27, 2012 || Mount Lemmon || Mount Lemmon Survey ||  || align=right data-sort-value="0.54" | 540 m || 
|-id=702 bgcolor=#fefefe
| 501702 ||  || — || September 25, 2014 || Mount Lemmon || Mount Lemmon Survey ||  || align=right data-sort-value="0.69" | 690 m || 
|-id=703 bgcolor=#fefefe
| 501703 ||  || — || October 5, 2007 || Kitt Peak || Spacewatch ||  || align=right data-sort-value="0.71" | 710 m || 
|-id=704 bgcolor=#fefefe
| 501704 ||  || — || October 19, 2007 || Kitt Peak || Spacewatch ||  || align=right data-sort-value="0.65" | 650 m || 
|-id=705 bgcolor=#E9E9E9
| 501705 ||  || — || October 31, 2010 || Mount Lemmon || Mount Lemmon Survey ||  || align=right data-sort-value="0.83" | 830 m || 
|-id=706 bgcolor=#fefefe
| 501706 ||  || — || June 18, 2013 || Haleakala || Pan-STARRS ||  || align=right data-sort-value="0.70" | 700 m || 
|-id=707 bgcolor=#E9E9E9
| 501707 ||  || — || April 25, 2003 || Kitt Peak || Spacewatch || WIT || align=right | 2.7 km || 
|-id=708 bgcolor=#fefefe
| 501708 ||  || — || October 24, 2007 || Mount Lemmon || Mount Lemmon Survey ||  || align=right data-sort-value="0.72" | 720 m || 
|-id=709 bgcolor=#E9E9E9
| 501709 ||  || — || March 10, 2008 || Kitt Peak || Spacewatch ||  || align=right | 1.0 km || 
|-id=710 bgcolor=#fefefe
| 501710 ||  || — || August 31, 2014 || Haleakala || Pan-STARRS ||  || align=right data-sort-value="0.65" | 650 m || 
|-id=711 bgcolor=#fefefe
| 501711 ||  || — || December 29, 2011 || Mount Lemmon || Mount Lemmon Survey ||  || align=right data-sort-value="0.70" | 700 m || 
|-id=712 bgcolor=#fefefe
| 501712 ||  || — || February 9, 2005 || Kitt Peak || Spacewatch ||  || align=right data-sort-value="0.69" | 690 m || 
|-id=713 bgcolor=#fefefe
| 501713 ||  || — || October 16, 2007 || Mount Lemmon || Mount Lemmon Survey ||  || align=right data-sort-value="0.77" | 770 m || 
|-id=714 bgcolor=#fefefe
| 501714 ||  || — || April 1, 2005 || Kitt Peak || Spacewatch || NYS || align=right data-sort-value="0.82" | 820 m || 
|-id=715 bgcolor=#fefefe
| 501715 ||  || — || September 2, 2014 || Haleakala || Pan-STARRS ||  || align=right data-sort-value="0.57" | 570 m || 
|-id=716 bgcolor=#fefefe
| 501716 ||  || — || November 10, 2004 || Kitt Peak || Spacewatch ||  || align=right data-sort-value="0.98" | 980 m || 
|-id=717 bgcolor=#fefefe
| 501717 ||  || — || October 30, 1999 || Kitt Peak || Spacewatch ||  || align=right data-sort-value="0.87" | 870 m || 
|-id=718 bgcolor=#fefefe
| 501718 ||  || — || October 2, 1997 || Caussols || ODAS ||  || align=right data-sort-value="0.57" | 570 m || 
|-id=719 bgcolor=#fefefe
| 501719 ||  || — || October 17, 2003 || Kitt Peak || Spacewatch ||  || align=right data-sort-value="0.86" | 860 m || 
|-id=720 bgcolor=#d6d6d6
| 501720 ||  || — || July 27, 2014 || Haleakala || Pan-STARRS ||  || align=right | 2.8 km || 
|-id=721 bgcolor=#fefefe
| 501721 ||  || — || January 18, 2012 || Mount Lemmon || Mount Lemmon Survey ||  || align=right data-sort-value="0.64" | 640 m || 
|-id=722 bgcolor=#fefefe
| 501722 ||  || — || October 2, 2014 || Haleakala || Pan-STARRS ||  || align=right data-sort-value="0.54" | 540 m || 
|-id=723 bgcolor=#fefefe
| 501723 ||  || — || November 7, 2007 || Kitt Peak || Spacewatch ||  || align=right data-sort-value="0.70" | 700 m || 
|-id=724 bgcolor=#fefefe
| 501724 ||  || — || September 18, 2001 || Anderson Mesa || LONEOS ||  || align=right data-sort-value="0.51" | 510 m || 
|-id=725 bgcolor=#E9E9E9
| 501725 ||  || — || October 20, 2006 || Mount Lemmon || Mount Lemmon Survey ||  || align=right | 1.5 km || 
|-id=726 bgcolor=#fefefe
| 501726 ||  || — || October 12, 2007 || Kitt Peak || Spacewatch ||  || align=right data-sort-value="0.52" | 520 m || 
|-id=727 bgcolor=#fefefe
| 501727 ||  || — || February 1, 2005 || Kitt Peak || Spacewatch ||  || align=right data-sort-value="0.60" | 600 m || 
|-id=728 bgcolor=#fefefe
| 501728 ||  || — || March 6, 1999 || Kitt Peak || Spacewatch ||  || align=right data-sort-value="0.63" | 630 m || 
|-id=729 bgcolor=#fefefe
| 501729 ||  || — || September 18, 2007 || Mount Lemmon || Mount Lemmon Survey ||  || align=right data-sort-value="0.82" | 820 m || 
|-id=730 bgcolor=#fefefe
| 501730 ||  || — || November 13, 2007 || Mount Lemmon || Mount Lemmon Survey ||  || align=right data-sort-value="0.79" | 790 m || 
|-id=731 bgcolor=#FA8072
| 501731 ||  || — || October 3, 2014 || Mount Lemmon || Mount Lemmon Survey ||  || align=right data-sort-value="0.59" | 590 m || 
|-id=732 bgcolor=#fefefe
| 501732 ||  || — || January 19, 2012 || Haleakala || Pan-STARRS ||  || align=right data-sort-value="0.85" | 850 m || 
|-id=733 bgcolor=#E9E9E9
| 501733 ||  || — || October 23, 2006 || Kitt Peak || Spacewatch ||  || align=right | 1.3 km || 
|-id=734 bgcolor=#fefefe
| 501734 ||  || — || November 26, 2003 || Kitt Peak || Spacewatch ||  || align=right data-sort-value="0.88" | 880 m || 
|-id=735 bgcolor=#fefefe
| 501735 ||  || — || April 26, 2006 || Kitt Peak || Spacewatch ||  || align=right data-sort-value="0.83" | 830 m || 
|-id=736 bgcolor=#fefefe
| 501736 ||  || — || October 15, 2007 || Mount Lemmon || Mount Lemmon Survey ||  || align=right data-sort-value="0.55" | 550 m || 
|-id=737 bgcolor=#fefefe
| 501737 ||  || — || September 19, 2003 || Anderson Mesa || LONEOS || MAS || align=right data-sort-value="0.80" | 800 m || 
|-id=738 bgcolor=#fefefe
| 501738 ||  || — || April 19, 2007 || Mount Lemmon || Mount Lemmon Survey ||  || align=right data-sort-value="0.58" | 580 m || 
|-id=739 bgcolor=#fefefe
| 501739 ||  || — || November 30, 2011 || Kitt Peak || Spacewatch ||  || align=right data-sort-value="0.58" | 580 m || 
|-id=740 bgcolor=#E9E9E9
| 501740 ||  || — || October 15, 2014 || Kitt Peak || Spacewatch || WIT || align=right | 2.2 km || 
|-id=741 bgcolor=#fefefe
| 501741 ||  || — || October 16, 2014 || Kitt Peak || Spacewatch ||  || align=right data-sort-value="0.62" | 620 m || 
|-id=742 bgcolor=#fefefe
| 501742 ||  || — || December 21, 2008 || Kitt Peak || Spacewatch ||  || align=right data-sort-value="0.67" | 670 m || 
|-id=743 bgcolor=#FA8072
| 501743 ||  || — || July 6, 1997 || Kitt Peak || Spacewatch ||  || align=right data-sort-value="0.60" | 600 m || 
|-id=744 bgcolor=#fefefe
| 501744 ||  || — || November 19, 2003 || Kitt Peak || Spacewatch ||  || align=right data-sort-value="0.67" | 670 m || 
|-id=745 bgcolor=#fefefe
| 501745 ||  || — || January 17, 2009 || Mount Lemmon || Mount Lemmon Survey ||  || align=right data-sort-value="0.77" | 770 m || 
|-id=746 bgcolor=#fefefe
| 501746 ||  || — || October 31, 2007 || Mount Lemmon || Mount Lemmon Survey ||  || align=right data-sort-value="0.80" | 800 m || 
|-id=747 bgcolor=#fefefe
| 501747 ||  || — || October 14, 2007 || Mount Lemmon || Mount Lemmon Survey || NYS || align=right data-sort-value="0.47" | 470 m || 
|-id=748 bgcolor=#fefefe
| 501748 ||  || — || April 15, 2007 || Kitt Peak || Spacewatch ||  || align=right data-sort-value="0.69" | 690 m || 
|-id=749 bgcolor=#fefefe
| 501749 ||  || — || September 10, 2004 || Socorro || LINEAR ||  || align=right data-sort-value="0.68" | 680 m || 
|-id=750 bgcolor=#fefefe
| 501750 ||  || — || January 31, 2012 || Catalina || CSS ||  || align=right data-sort-value="0.75" | 750 m || 
|-id=751 bgcolor=#fefefe
| 501751 ||  || — || September 24, 2014 || Mount Lemmon || Mount Lemmon Survey ||  || align=right data-sort-value="0.61" | 610 m || 
|-id=752 bgcolor=#fefefe
| 501752 ||  || — || December 19, 2003 || Kitt Peak || Spacewatch ||  || align=right data-sort-value="0.76" | 760 m || 
|-id=753 bgcolor=#fefefe
| 501753 ||  || — || December 3, 2000 || Kitt Peak || Spacewatch || V || align=right data-sort-value="0.58" | 580 m || 
|-id=754 bgcolor=#fefefe
| 501754 ||  || — || September 26, 2006 || Kitt Peak || Spacewatch ||  || align=right data-sort-value="0.87" | 870 m || 
|-id=755 bgcolor=#fefefe
| 501755 ||  || — || August 30, 2014 || Haleakala || Pan-STARRS ||  || align=right data-sort-value="0.67" | 670 m || 
|-id=756 bgcolor=#fefefe
| 501756 ||  || — || May 7, 2010 || Mount Lemmon || Mount Lemmon Survey ||  || align=right data-sort-value="0.61" | 610 m || 
|-id=757 bgcolor=#fefefe
| 501757 ||  || — || September 12, 2001 || Socorro || LINEAR ||  || align=right data-sort-value="0.64" | 640 m || 
|-id=758 bgcolor=#fefefe
| 501758 ||  || — || November 30, 2000 || Kitt Peak || Spacewatch ||  || align=right data-sort-value="0.75" | 750 m || 
|-id=759 bgcolor=#fefefe
| 501759 ||  || — || December 22, 2003 || Kitt Peak || Spacewatch ||  || align=right data-sort-value="0.81" | 810 m || 
|-id=760 bgcolor=#fefefe
| 501760 ||  || — || April 2, 2006 || Kitt Peak || Spacewatch ||  || align=right data-sort-value="0.79" | 790 m || 
|-id=761 bgcolor=#fefefe
| 501761 ||  || — || April 13, 2013 || Haleakala || Pan-STARRS ||  || align=right data-sort-value="0.75" | 750 m || 
|-id=762 bgcolor=#fefefe
| 501762 ||  || — || August 10, 2007 || Kitt Peak || Spacewatch ||  || align=right data-sort-value="0.62" | 620 m || 
|-id=763 bgcolor=#fefefe
| 501763 ||  || — || September 13, 2004 || Kitt Peak || Spacewatch ||  || align=right data-sort-value="0.63" | 630 m || 
|-id=764 bgcolor=#fefefe
| 501764 ||  || — || August 31, 2014 || Haleakala || Pan-STARRS ||  || align=right data-sort-value="0.83" | 830 m || 
|-id=765 bgcolor=#fefefe
| 501765 ||  || — || May 8, 2010 || Mount Lemmon || Mount Lemmon Survey ||  || align=right data-sort-value="0.68" | 680 m || 
|-id=766 bgcolor=#fefefe
| 501766 ||  || — || April 7, 2013 || Mount Lemmon || Mount Lemmon Survey ||  || align=right data-sort-value="0.80" | 800 m || 
|-id=767 bgcolor=#FA8072
| 501767 ||  || — || May 9, 2010 || Mount Lemmon || Mount Lemmon Survey ||  || align=right data-sort-value="0.55" | 550 m || 
|-id=768 bgcolor=#fefefe
| 501768 ||  || — || December 27, 2011 || Mount Lemmon || Mount Lemmon Survey ||  || align=right data-sort-value="0.47" | 470 m || 
|-id=769 bgcolor=#fefefe
| 501769 ||  || — || October 31, 2007 || Kitt Peak || Spacewatch ||  || align=right data-sort-value="0.59" | 590 m || 
|-id=770 bgcolor=#fefefe
| 501770 ||  || — || September 11, 2001 || Anderson Mesa || LONEOS ||  || align=right data-sort-value="0.76" | 760 m || 
|-id=771 bgcolor=#FA8072
| 501771 ||  || — || October 11, 2007 || Mount Lemmon || Mount Lemmon Survey ||  || align=right data-sort-value="0.71" | 710 m || 
|-id=772 bgcolor=#fefefe
| 501772 ||  || — || September 25, 2007 || Mount Lemmon || Mount Lemmon Survey ||  || align=right data-sort-value="0.70" | 700 m || 
|-id=773 bgcolor=#fefefe
| 501773 ||  || — || January 17, 2009 || Kitt Peak || Spacewatch ||  || align=right | 1.0 km || 
|-id=774 bgcolor=#fefefe
| 501774 ||  || — || April 6, 2013 || Haleakala || Pan-STARRS ||  || align=right data-sort-value="0.69" | 690 m || 
|-id=775 bgcolor=#fefefe
| 501775 ||  || — || April 10, 2013 || Haleakala || Pan-STARRS ||  || align=right data-sort-value="0.60" | 600 m || 
|-id=776 bgcolor=#fefefe
| 501776 ||  || — || September 17, 2004 || Kitt Peak || Spacewatch ||  || align=right data-sort-value="0.54" | 540 m || 
|-id=777 bgcolor=#fefefe
| 501777 ||  || — || January 25, 2006 || Kitt Peak || Spacewatch ||  || align=right data-sort-value="0.77" | 770 m || 
|-id=778 bgcolor=#fefefe
| 501778 ||  || — || January 20, 2009 || Catalina || CSS ||  || align=right data-sort-value="0.69" | 690 m || 
|-id=779 bgcolor=#fefefe
| 501779 ||  || — || May 28, 2010 || WISE || WISE ||  || align=right | 2.3 km || 
|-id=780 bgcolor=#fefefe
| 501780 ||  || — || December 27, 2011 || Mount Lemmon || Mount Lemmon Survey ||  || align=right data-sort-value="0.80" | 800 m || 
|-id=781 bgcolor=#fefefe
| 501781 ||  || — || September 4, 2003 || Kitt Peak || Spacewatch ||  || align=right data-sort-value="0.60" | 600 m || 
|-id=782 bgcolor=#fefefe
| 501782 ||  || — || December 31, 2007 || Kitt Peak || Spacewatch ||  || align=right data-sort-value="0.61" | 610 m || 
|-id=783 bgcolor=#fefefe
| 501783 ||  || — || October 9, 2007 || Mount Lemmon || Mount Lemmon Survey ||  || align=right data-sort-value="0.45" | 450 m || 
|-id=784 bgcolor=#fefefe
| 501784 ||  || — || February 27, 2012 || Haleakala || Pan-STARRS ||  || align=right data-sort-value="0.70" | 700 m || 
|-id=785 bgcolor=#fefefe
| 501785 ||  || — || November 29, 2011 || Kitt Peak || Spacewatch ||  || align=right data-sort-value="0.70" | 700 m || 
|-id=786 bgcolor=#fefefe
| 501786 ||  || — || October 20, 2007 || Mount Lemmon || Mount Lemmon Survey ||  || align=right data-sort-value="0.58" | 580 m || 
|-id=787 bgcolor=#fefefe
| 501787 ||  || — || October 23, 2014 || Kitt Peak || Spacewatch ||  || align=right data-sort-value="0.62" | 620 m || 
|-id=788 bgcolor=#fefefe
| 501788 ||  || — || September 24, 1995 || Kitt Peak || Spacewatch || MAS || align=right data-sort-value="0.50" | 500 m || 
|-id=789 bgcolor=#fefefe
| 501789 ||  || — || September 17, 1995 || Kitt Peak || Spacewatch ||  || align=right data-sort-value="0.72" | 720 m || 
|-id=790 bgcolor=#fefefe
| 501790 ||  || — || October 10, 2004 || Kitt Peak || Spacewatch ||  || align=right data-sort-value="0.51" | 510 m || 
|-id=791 bgcolor=#fefefe
| 501791 ||  || — || October 12, 1996 || Kitt Peak || Spacewatch ||  || align=right data-sort-value="0.87" | 870 m || 
|-id=792 bgcolor=#E9E9E9
| 501792 ||  || — || April 14, 2004 || Kitt Peak || Spacewatch ||  || align=right | 1.2 km || 
|-id=793 bgcolor=#fefefe
| 501793 ||  || — || February 14, 2012 || Haleakala || Pan-STARRS ||  || align=right data-sort-value="0.52" | 520 m || 
|-id=794 bgcolor=#E9E9E9
| 501794 ||  || — || April 28, 2012 || Mount Lemmon || Mount Lemmon Survey ||  || align=right | 1.7 km || 
|-id=795 bgcolor=#fefefe
| 501795 ||  || — || December 25, 2011 || Kitt Peak || Spacewatch ||  || align=right data-sort-value="0.50" | 500 m || 
|-id=796 bgcolor=#fefefe
| 501796 ||  || — || November 8, 1991 || Kitt Peak || Spacewatch ||  || align=right data-sort-value="0.93" | 930 m || 
|-id=797 bgcolor=#fefefe
| 501797 ||  || — || September 28, 2003 || Kitt Peak || Spacewatch ||  || align=right data-sort-value="0.81" | 810 m || 
|-id=798 bgcolor=#fefefe
| 501798 ||  || — || January 30, 2012 || Mount Lemmon || Mount Lemmon Survey ||  || align=right data-sort-value="0.60" | 600 m || 
|-id=799 bgcolor=#fefefe
| 501799 ||  || — || October 30, 2007 || Kitt Peak || Spacewatch ||  || align=right data-sort-value="0.74" | 740 m || 
|-id=800 bgcolor=#fefefe
| 501800 ||  || — || November 5, 2007 || Mount Lemmon || Mount Lemmon Survey ||  || align=right data-sort-value="0.68" | 680 m || 
|}

501801–501900 

|-bgcolor=#fefefe
| 501801 ||  || — || November 2, 2007 || Kitt Peak || Spacewatch ||  || align=right data-sort-value="0.50" | 500 m || 
|-id=802 bgcolor=#fefefe
| 501802 ||  || — || October 8, 2004 || Socorro || LINEAR ||  || align=right data-sort-value="0.62" | 620 m || 
|-id=803 bgcolor=#fefefe
| 501803 ||  || — || November 9, 2007 || Mount Lemmon || Mount Lemmon Survey || NYS || align=right data-sort-value="0.77" | 770 m || 
|-id=804 bgcolor=#fefefe
| 501804 ||  || — || December 30, 2008 || Mount Lemmon || Mount Lemmon Survey ||  || align=right data-sort-value="0.83" | 830 m || 
|-id=805 bgcolor=#fefefe
| 501805 ||  || — || October 11, 2010 || Mount Lemmon || Mount Lemmon Survey ||  || align=right data-sort-value="0.84" | 840 m || 
|-id=806 bgcolor=#fefefe
| 501806 ||  || — || November 7, 2007 || Kitt Peak || Spacewatch ||  || align=right data-sort-value="0.81" | 810 m || 
|-id=807 bgcolor=#fefefe
| 501807 ||  || — || September 3, 2014 || Mount Lemmon || Mount Lemmon Survey || NYS || align=right data-sort-value="0.71" | 710 m || 
|-id=808 bgcolor=#fefefe
| 501808 ||  || — || November 19, 2007 || La Sagra || OAM Obs. ||  || align=right data-sort-value="0.64" | 640 m || 
|-id=809 bgcolor=#fefefe
| 501809 ||  || — || October 18, 2003 || Kitt Peak || Spacewatch ||  || align=right data-sort-value="0.94" | 940 m || 
|-id=810 bgcolor=#fefefe
| 501810 ||  || — || April 13, 2013 || Haleakala || Pan-STARRS ||  || align=right data-sort-value="0.69" | 690 m || 
|-id=811 bgcolor=#E9E9E9
| 501811 ||  || — || January 7, 2003 || Socorro || LINEAR ||  || align=right data-sort-value="0.87" | 870 m || 
|-id=812 bgcolor=#fefefe
| 501812 ||  || — || January 3, 2012 || Kitt Peak || Spacewatch ||  || align=right data-sort-value="0.70" | 700 m || 
|-id=813 bgcolor=#E9E9E9
| 501813 ||  || — || December 2, 2010 || Kitt Peak || Spacewatch ||  || align=right | 1.0 km || 
|-id=814 bgcolor=#fefefe
| 501814 ||  || — || September 10, 2004 || Kitt Peak || Spacewatch ||  || align=right data-sort-value="0.53" | 530 m || 
|-id=815 bgcolor=#fefefe
| 501815 ||  || — || August 31, 2014 || Haleakala || Pan-STARRS ||  || align=right data-sort-value="0.62" | 620 m || 
|-id=816 bgcolor=#fefefe
| 501816 ||  || — || April 30, 2013 || Kitt Peak || Spacewatch ||  || align=right data-sort-value="0.64" | 640 m || 
|-id=817 bgcolor=#fefefe
| 501817 ||  || — || August 31, 2014 || Haleakala || Pan-STARRS ||  || align=right data-sort-value="0.75" | 750 m || 
|-id=818 bgcolor=#fefefe
| 501818 ||  || — || February 3, 2009 || Mount Lemmon || Mount Lemmon Survey ||  || align=right data-sort-value="0.62" | 620 m || 
|-id=819 bgcolor=#fefefe
| 501819 ||  || — || November 30, 2011 || Kitt Peak || Spacewatch ||  || align=right data-sort-value="0.67" | 670 m || 
|-id=820 bgcolor=#fefefe
| 501820 ||  || — || May 2, 2013 || Haleakala || Pan-STARRS ||  || align=right data-sort-value="0.60" | 600 m || 
|-id=821 bgcolor=#fefefe
| 501821 ||  || — || October 30, 2007 || Mount Lemmon || Mount Lemmon Survey ||  || align=right data-sort-value="0.51" | 510 m || 
|-id=822 bgcolor=#fefefe
| 501822 ||  || — || March 3, 2009 || Mount Lemmon || Mount Lemmon Survey ||  || align=right data-sort-value="0.53" | 530 m || 
|-id=823 bgcolor=#fefefe
| 501823 ||  || — || September 18, 2003 || Kitt Peak || Spacewatch ||  || align=right data-sort-value="0.65" | 650 m || 
|-id=824 bgcolor=#E9E9E9
| 501824 ||  || — || July 14, 2013 || Haleakala || Pan-STARRS || AGN || align=right | 1.9 km || 
|-id=825 bgcolor=#fefefe
| 501825 ||  || — || January 17, 2009 || Kitt Peak || Spacewatch ||  || align=right data-sort-value="0.79" | 790 m || 
|-id=826 bgcolor=#fefefe
| 501826 ||  || — || September 9, 2007 || Anderson Mesa || LONEOS ||  || align=right data-sort-value="0.62" | 620 m || 
|-id=827 bgcolor=#FA8072
| 501827 ||  || — || September 23, 2011 || Mount Lemmon || Mount Lemmon Survey ||  || align=right data-sort-value="0.57" | 570 m || 
|-id=828 bgcolor=#fefefe
| 501828 ||  || — || December 10, 2004 || Socorro || LINEAR ||  || align=right data-sort-value="0.69" | 690 m || 
|-id=829 bgcolor=#fefefe
| 501829 ||  || — || September 7, 2004 || Kitt Peak || Spacewatch ||  || align=right data-sort-value="0.58" | 580 m || 
|-id=830 bgcolor=#fefefe
| 501830 ||  || — || November 26, 2003 || Kitt Peak || Spacewatch ||  || align=right data-sort-value="0.84" | 840 m || 
|-id=831 bgcolor=#fefefe
| 501831 ||  || — || January 30, 2009 || Mount Lemmon || Mount Lemmon Survey ||  || align=right data-sort-value="0.61" | 610 m || 
|-id=832 bgcolor=#fefefe
| 501832 ||  || — || February 27, 2012 || Haleakala || Pan-STARRS ||  || align=right data-sort-value="0.57" | 570 m || 
|-id=833 bgcolor=#fefefe
| 501833 ||  || — || October 20, 2007 || Catalina || CSS ||  || align=right data-sort-value="0.69" | 690 m || 
|-id=834 bgcolor=#fefefe
| 501834 ||  || — || January 7, 2005 || Campo Imperatore || CINEOS ||  || align=right data-sort-value="0.56" | 560 m || 
|-id=835 bgcolor=#fefefe
| 501835 ||  || — || October 18, 2007 || Mount Lemmon || Mount Lemmon Survey ||  || align=right data-sort-value="0.59" | 590 m || 
|-id=836 bgcolor=#E9E9E9
| 501836 ||  || — || January 17, 2007 || Kitt Peak || Spacewatch ||  || align=right | 1.5 km || 
|-id=837 bgcolor=#fefefe
| 501837 ||  || — || May 24, 2006 || Mount Lemmon || Mount Lemmon Survey ||  || align=right data-sort-value="0.71" | 710 m || 
|-id=838 bgcolor=#fefefe
| 501838 ||  || — || January 26, 2001 || Kitt Peak || Spacewatch ||  || align=right data-sort-value="0.57" | 570 m || 
|-id=839 bgcolor=#fefefe
| 501839 ||  || — || March 10, 2005 || Mount Lemmon || Mount Lemmon Survey ||  || align=right data-sort-value="0.65" | 650 m || 
|-id=840 bgcolor=#d6d6d6
| 501840 ||  || — || November 17, 2014 || Haleakala || Pan-STARRS ||  || align=right | 3.1 km || 
|-id=841 bgcolor=#fefefe
| 501841 ||  || — || December 14, 2003 || Kitt Peak || Spacewatch || MAS || align=right data-sort-value="0.80" | 800 m || 
|-id=842 bgcolor=#fefefe
| 501842 ||  || — || February 27, 2012 || Haleakala || Pan-STARRS ||  || align=right data-sort-value="0.76" | 760 m || 
|-id=843 bgcolor=#fefefe
| 501843 ||  || — || August 23, 2007 || Kitt Peak || Spacewatch ||  || align=right data-sort-value="0.51" | 510 m || 
|-id=844 bgcolor=#E9E9E9
| 501844 ||  || — || July 1, 2013 || Haleakala || Pan-STARRS ||  || align=right data-sort-value="0.77" | 770 m || 
|-id=845 bgcolor=#fefefe
| 501845 ||  || — || June 19, 2010 || Mount Lemmon || Mount Lemmon Survey ||  || align=right data-sort-value="0.68" | 680 m || 
|-id=846 bgcolor=#E9E9E9
| 501846 ||  || — || January 8, 2011 || Mount Lemmon || Mount Lemmon Survey ||  || align=right | 1.5 km || 
|-id=847 bgcolor=#E9E9E9
| 501847 ||  || — || December 14, 2010 || Catalina || CSS ||  || align=right | 1.1 km || 
|-id=848 bgcolor=#fefefe
| 501848 ||  || — || October 23, 2014 || Kitt Peak || Spacewatch ||  || align=right data-sort-value="0.60" | 600 m || 
|-id=849 bgcolor=#fefefe
| 501849 ||  || — || March 8, 2005 || Kitt Peak || Spacewatch ||  || align=right data-sort-value="0.68" | 680 m || 
|-id=850 bgcolor=#fefefe
| 501850 ||  || — || January 5, 2012 || Kitt Peak || Spacewatch ||  || align=right data-sort-value="0.75" | 750 m || 
|-id=851 bgcolor=#E9E9E9
| 501851 ||  || — || July 15, 2013 || Haleakala || Pan-STARRS ||  || align=right data-sort-value="0.94" | 940 m || 
|-id=852 bgcolor=#fefefe
| 501852 ||  || — || July 8, 2010 || Kitt Peak || Spacewatch || V || align=right data-sort-value="0.62" | 620 m || 
|-id=853 bgcolor=#fefefe
| 501853 ||  || — || October 21, 2007 || Mount Lemmon || Mount Lemmon Survey ||  || align=right | 1.0 km || 
|-id=854 bgcolor=#fefefe
| 501854 ||  || — || June 7, 2013 || Haleakala || Pan-STARRS ||  || align=right data-sort-value="0.78" | 780 m || 
|-id=855 bgcolor=#fefefe
| 501855 ||  || — || November 20, 2001 || Socorro || LINEAR ||  || align=right data-sort-value="0.60" | 600 m || 
|-id=856 bgcolor=#fefefe
| 501856 ||  || — || February 29, 2008 || XuYi || PMO NEO ||  || align=right data-sort-value="0.75" | 750 m || 
|-id=857 bgcolor=#E9E9E9
| 501857 ||  || — || February 22, 2006 || Catalina || CSS ||  || align=right | 2.8 km || 
|-id=858 bgcolor=#E9E9E9
| 501858 ||  || — || April 28, 2012 || Kitt Peak || Spacewatch ||  || align=right | 1.1 km || 
|-id=859 bgcolor=#fefefe
| 501859 ||  || — || November 2, 2007 || Mount Lemmon || Mount Lemmon Survey ||  || align=right data-sort-value="0.53" | 530 m || 
|-id=860 bgcolor=#fefefe
| 501860 ||  || — || March 21, 2002 || Kitt Peak || Spacewatch ||  || align=right data-sort-value="0.69" | 690 m || 
|-id=861 bgcolor=#fefefe
| 501861 ||  || — || January 21, 2012 || Kitt Peak || Spacewatch ||  || align=right data-sort-value="0.53" | 530 m || 
|-id=862 bgcolor=#fefefe
| 501862 ||  || — || January 19, 2004 || Kitt Peak || Spacewatch ||  || align=right data-sort-value="0.57" | 570 m || 
|-id=863 bgcolor=#fefefe
| 501863 ||  || — || February 1, 2008 || Mount Lemmon || Mount Lemmon Survey ||  || align=right data-sort-value="0.64" | 640 m || 
|-id=864 bgcolor=#fefefe
| 501864 ||  || — || March 12, 2008 || Mount Lemmon || Mount Lemmon Survey ||  || align=right data-sort-value="0.73" | 730 m || 
|-id=865 bgcolor=#fefefe
| 501865 ||  || — || November 18, 2003 || Kitt Peak || Spacewatch ||  || align=right data-sort-value="0.70" | 700 m || 
|-id=866 bgcolor=#fefefe
| 501866 ||  || — || November 16, 1995 || Kitt Peak || Spacewatch ||  || align=right data-sort-value="0.47" | 470 m || 
|-id=867 bgcolor=#E9E9E9
| 501867 ||  || — || July 1, 2013 || Haleakala || Pan-STARRS ||  || align=right | 1.3 km || 
|-id=868 bgcolor=#fefefe
| 501868 ||  || — || June 18, 2013 || Haleakala || Pan-STARRS ||  || align=right data-sort-value="0.93" | 930 m || 
|-id=869 bgcolor=#fefefe
| 501869 ||  || — || September 29, 2010 || Mount Lemmon || Mount Lemmon Survey ||  || align=right data-sort-value="0.63" | 630 m || 
|-id=870 bgcolor=#fefefe
| 501870 ||  || — || September 4, 2014 || Haleakala || Pan-STARRS ||  || align=right data-sort-value="0.74" | 740 m || 
|-id=871 bgcolor=#fefefe
| 501871 ||  || — || May 16, 2013 || Haleakala || Pan-STARRS ||  || align=right data-sort-value="0.82" | 820 m || 
|-id=872 bgcolor=#E9E9E9
| 501872 ||  || — || November 16, 2006 || Mount Lemmon || Mount Lemmon Survey ||  || align=right | 1.5 km || 
|-id=873 bgcolor=#fefefe
| 501873 ||  || — || August 14, 2010 || Kitt Peak || Spacewatch || V || align=right data-sort-value="0.55" | 550 m || 
|-id=874 bgcolor=#fefefe
| 501874 ||  || — || September 11, 2007 || Catalina || CSS ||  || align=right data-sort-value="0.64" | 640 m || 
|-id=875 bgcolor=#fefefe
| 501875 ||  || — || May 14, 2010 || Mount Lemmon || Mount Lemmon Survey ||  || align=right data-sort-value="0.74" | 740 m || 
|-id=876 bgcolor=#E9E9E9
| 501876 ||  || — || September 19, 2008 || Kitt Peak || Spacewatch ||  || align=right | 2.4 km || 
|-id=877 bgcolor=#fefefe
| 501877 ||  || — || September 15, 2007 || Kitt Peak || Spacewatch ||  || align=right data-sort-value="0.64" | 640 m || 
|-id=878 bgcolor=#FFC2E0
| 501878 ||  || — || November 25, 2014 || Haleakala || Pan-STARRS || APO +1km || align=right | 2.2 km || 
|-id=879 bgcolor=#fefefe
| 501879 ||  || — || September 18, 2003 || Kitt Peak || Spacewatch || V || align=right data-sort-value="0.55" | 550 m || 
|-id=880 bgcolor=#E9E9E9
| 501880 ||  || — || October 18, 2009 || Mount Lemmon || Mount Lemmon Survey ||  || align=right | 2.0 km || 
|-id=881 bgcolor=#fefefe
| 501881 ||  || — || September 9, 2007 || Mount Lemmon || Mount Lemmon Survey ||  || align=right data-sort-value="0.61" | 610 m || 
|-id=882 bgcolor=#fefefe
| 501882 ||  || — || September 10, 2007 || Mount Lemmon || Mount Lemmon Survey ||  || align=right data-sort-value="0.64" | 640 m || 
|-id=883 bgcolor=#d6d6d6
| 501883 ||  || — || December 6, 2008 || Kitt Peak || Spacewatch ||  || align=right | 3.5 km || 
|-id=884 bgcolor=#E9E9E9
| 501884 ||  || — || October 24, 2014 || Mount Lemmon || Mount Lemmon Survey ||  || align=right | 2.9 km || 
|-id=885 bgcolor=#fefefe
| 501885 ||  || — || October 16, 2007 || Kitt Peak || Spacewatch ||  || align=right data-sort-value="0.42" | 420 m || 
|-id=886 bgcolor=#fefefe
| 501886 ||  || — || January 1, 2008 || Kitt Peak || Spacewatch ||  || align=right data-sort-value="0.59" | 590 m || 
|-id=887 bgcolor=#fefefe
| 501887 ||  || — || January 3, 2012 || Mount Lemmon || Mount Lemmon Survey ||  || align=right data-sort-value="0.57" | 570 m || 
|-id=888 bgcolor=#E9E9E9
| 501888 ||  || — || March 11, 2011 || Catalina || CSS ||  || align=right | 1.9 km || 
|-id=889 bgcolor=#E9E9E9
| 501889 ||  || — || November 26, 2014 || Mount Lemmon || Mount Lemmon Survey || EUN || align=right | 1.0 km || 
|-id=890 bgcolor=#d6d6d6
| 501890 ||  || — || March 26, 2010 || WISE || WISE || YAK || align=right | 3.2 km || 
|-id=891 bgcolor=#E9E9E9
| 501891 ||  || — || February 25, 2011 || Mount Lemmon || Mount Lemmon Survey ||  || align=right | 2.2 km || 
|-id=892 bgcolor=#E9E9E9
| 501892 ||  || — || October 6, 2008 || Catalina || CSS ||  || align=right | 2.5 km || 
|-id=893 bgcolor=#E9E9E9
| 501893 ||  || — || January 12, 2002 || Kitt Peak || Spacewatch ||  || align=right | 1.9 km || 
|-id=894 bgcolor=#fefefe
| 501894 ||  || — || January 16, 2007 || Anderson Mesa || LONEOS ||  || align=right data-sort-value="0.76" | 760 m || 
|-id=895 bgcolor=#d6d6d6
| 501895 ||  || — || April 2, 2005 || Kitt Peak || Spacewatch || EOS || align=right | 2.2 km || 
|-id=896 bgcolor=#E9E9E9
| 501896 ||  || — || November 26, 2009 || Kitt Peak || Spacewatch || GEF || align=right | 3.0 km || 
|-id=897 bgcolor=#E9E9E9
| 501897 ||  || — || February 27, 2006 || Kitt Peak || Spacewatch ||  || align=right | 2.5 km || 
|-id=898 bgcolor=#E9E9E9
| 501898 ||  || — || September 3, 2008 || Kitt Peak || Spacewatch ||  || align=right | 2.9 km || 
|-id=899 bgcolor=#fefefe
| 501899 ||  || — || October 7, 2004 || Kitt Peak || Spacewatch ||  || align=right data-sort-value="0.46" | 460 m || 
|-id=900 bgcolor=#fefefe
| 501900 ||  || — || December 20, 2004 || Mount Lemmon || Mount Lemmon Survey || V || align=right data-sort-value="0.62" | 620 m || 
|}

501901–502000 

|-bgcolor=#E9E9E9
| 501901 ||  || — || March 15, 2012 || Haleakala || Pan-STARRS ||  || align=right | 1.3 km || 
|-id=902 bgcolor=#fefefe
| 501902 ||  || — || September 10, 2007 || Kitt Peak || Spacewatch ||  || align=right data-sort-value="0.68" | 680 m || 
|-id=903 bgcolor=#d6d6d6
| 501903 ||  || — || November 10, 2009 || Kitt Peak || Spacewatch ||  || align=right | 2.4 km || 
|-id=904 bgcolor=#fefefe
| 501904 ||  || — || October 5, 2007 || Kitt Peak || Spacewatch ||  || align=right data-sort-value="0.61" | 610 m || 
|-id=905 bgcolor=#d6d6d6
| 501905 ||  || — || January 19, 1999 || Kitt Peak || Spacewatch || EOS || align=right | 2.1 km || 
|-id=906 bgcolor=#E9E9E9
| 501906 ||  || — || August 19, 2004 || Siding Spring || SSS || GEF || align=right | 1.6 km || 
|-id=907 bgcolor=#d6d6d6
| 501907 ||  || — || March 16, 2004 || Kitt Peak || Spacewatch ||  || align=right | 2.4 km || 
|-id=908 bgcolor=#E9E9E9
| 501908 ||  || — || March 10, 2011 || Catalina || CSS || EUN || align=right | 1.5 km || 
|-id=909 bgcolor=#d6d6d6
| 501909 ||  || — || December 3, 2008 || Mount Lemmon || Mount Lemmon Survey ||  || align=right | 4.3 km || 
|-id=910 bgcolor=#E9E9E9
| 501910 ||  || — || November 27, 2014 || Mount Lemmon || Mount Lemmon Survey ||  || align=right | 2.9 km || 
|-id=911 bgcolor=#fefefe
| 501911 ||  || — || October 20, 2007 || Mount Lemmon || Mount Lemmon Survey ||  || align=right data-sort-value="0.53" | 530 m || 
|-id=912 bgcolor=#E9E9E9
| 501912 ||  || — || March 4, 2011 || Mount Lemmon || Mount Lemmon Survey ||  || align=right | 1.2 km || 
|-id=913 bgcolor=#E9E9E9
| 501913 ||  || — || November 28, 2014 || Haleakala || Pan-STARRS || HNS || align=right | 1.6 km || 
|-id=914 bgcolor=#d6d6d6
| 501914 ||  || — || December 29, 2008 || Kitt Peak || Spacewatch ||  || align=right | 3.4 km || 
|-id=915 bgcolor=#E9E9E9
| 501915 ||  || — || July 30, 2008 || Kitt Peak || Spacewatch ||  || align=right | 2.7 km || 
|-id=916 bgcolor=#d6d6d6
| 501916 ||  || — || November 23, 2009 || Kitt Peak || Spacewatch ||  || align=right | 3.9 km || 
|-id=917 bgcolor=#d6d6d6
| 501917 ||  || — || July 25, 2011 || Haleakala || Pan-STARRS || TIR || align=right | 3.5 km || 
|-id=918 bgcolor=#E9E9E9
| 501918 ||  || — || December 27, 2005 || Kitt Peak || Spacewatch ||  || align=right | 1.7 km || 
|-id=919 bgcolor=#d6d6d6
| 501919 ||  || — || September 2, 2008 || Kitt Peak || Spacewatch || EOS || align=right | 2.6 km || 
|-id=920 bgcolor=#E9E9E9
| 501920 ||  || — || September 14, 2013 || Haleakala || Pan-STARRS || MAR || align=right | 1.00 km || 
|-id=921 bgcolor=#E9E9E9
| 501921 ||  || — || November 18, 2009 || Mount Lemmon || Mount Lemmon Survey || ADE || align=right | 1.7 km || 
|-id=922 bgcolor=#fefefe
| 501922 ||  || — || November 20, 2007 || Mount Lemmon || Mount Lemmon Survey ||  || align=right | 1.1 km || 
|-id=923 bgcolor=#fefefe
| 501923 ||  || — || September 16, 2003 || Kitt Peak || Spacewatch ||  || align=right data-sort-value="0.74" | 740 m || 
|-id=924 bgcolor=#E9E9E9
| 501924 ||  || — || December 13, 2010 || Mount Lemmon || Mount Lemmon Survey ||  || align=right | 1.2 km || 
|-id=925 bgcolor=#E9E9E9
| 501925 ||  || — || March 5, 2011 || Catalina || CSS ||  || align=right | 1.2 km || 
|-id=926 bgcolor=#E9E9E9
| 501926 ||  || — || April 16, 2008 || Mount Lemmon || Mount Lemmon Survey || EUN || align=right | 1.1 km || 
|-id=927 bgcolor=#E9E9E9
| 501927 ||  || — || February 6, 2011 || Catalina || CSS ||  || align=right | 1.2 km || 
|-id=928 bgcolor=#E9E9E9
| 501928 ||  || — || February 25, 2011 || Kitt Peak || Spacewatch || EUN || align=right | 1.0 km || 
|-id=929 bgcolor=#E9E9E9
| 501929 ||  || — || September 24, 2013 || Catalina || CSS ||  || align=right | 1.3 km || 
|-id=930 bgcolor=#E9E9E9
| 501930 ||  || — || March 27, 2011 || Mount Lemmon || Mount Lemmon Survey || EUN || align=right | 1.3 km || 
|-id=931 bgcolor=#d6d6d6
| 501931 ||  || — || November 1, 2013 || Mount Lemmon || Mount Lemmon Survey ||  || align=right | 2.3 km || 
|-id=932 bgcolor=#E9E9E9
| 501932 ||  || — || December 6, 2010 || Catalina || CSS ||  || align=right | 1.0 km || 
|-id=933 bgcolor=#fefefe
| 501933 ||  || — || November 11, 2004 || Kitt Peak || Spacewatch ||  || align=right data-sort-value="0.64" | 640 m || 
|-id=934 bgcolor=#FFC2E0
| 501934 ||  || — || September 19, 2007 || Catalina || CSS || AMO +1km || align=right data-sort-value="0.87" | 870 m || 
|-id=935 bgcolor=#FA8072
| 501935 ||  || — || July 31, 2014 || Haleakala || Pan-STARRS ||  || align=right data-sort-value="0.54" | 540 m || 
|-id=936 bgcolor=#fefefe
| 501936 ||  || — || October 2, 1999 || Kitt Peak || Spacewatch || MAS || align=right data-sort-value="0.64" | 640 m || 
|-id=937 bgcolor=#E9E9E9
| 501937 ||  || — || May 12, 2012 || Haleakala || Pan-STARRS ||  || align=right | 1.7 km || 
|-id=938 bgcolor=#fefefe
| 501938 ||  || — || September 12, 2007 || Catalina || CSS ||  || align=right data-sort-value="0.83" | 830 m || 
|-id=939 bgcolor=#fefefe
| 501939 ||  || — || February 15, 2012 || Haleakala || Pan-STARRS ||  || align=right data-sort-value="0.73" | 730 m || 
|-id=940 bgcolor=#fefefe
| 501940 ||  || — || July 13, 2013 || Haleakala || Pan-STARRS ||  || align=right data-sort-value="0.79" | 790 m || 
|-id=941 bgcolor=#E9E9E9
| 501941 ||  || — || January 8, 2002 || Socorro || LINEAR ||  || align=right | 1.7 km || 
|-id=942 bgcolor=#d6d6d6
| 501942 ||  || — || April 20, 2006 || Kitt Peak || Spacewatch ||  || align=right | 2.6 km || 
|-id=943 bgcolor=#fefefe
| 501943 ||  || — || November 1, 2010 || Catalina || CSS || MAS || align=right data-sort-value="0.67" | 670 m || 
|-id=944 bgcolor=#fefefe
| 501944 ||  || — || December 2, 2014 || Haleakala || Pan-STARRS ||  || align=right data-sort-value="0.78" | 780 m || 
|-id=945 bgcolor=#fefefe
| 501945 ||  || — || March 16, 2012 || Kitt Peak || Spacewatch ||  || align=right data-sort-value="0.74" | 740 m || 
|-id=946 bgcolor=#d6d6d6
| 501946 ||  || — || May 21, 2011 || Mount Lemmon || Mount Lemmon Survey ||  || align=right | 3.1 km || 
|-id=947 bgcolor=#E9E9E9
| 501947 ||  || — || August 17, 2009 || Kitt Peak || Spacewatch ||  || align=right | 1.5 km || 
|-id=948 bgcolor=#E9E9E9
| 501948 ||  || — || December 31, 2000 || Kitt Peak || Spacewatch ||  || align=right | 2.9 km || 
|-id=949 bgcolor=#E9E9E9
| 501949 ||  || — || February 8, 2007 || Kitt Peak || Spacewatch ||  || align=right | 1.1 km || 
|-id=950 bgcolor=#E9E9E9
| 501950 ||  || — || December 18, 2014 || Haleakala || Pan-STARRS ||  || align=right | 1.4 km || 
|-id=951 bgcolor=#E9E9E9
| 501951 ||  || — || January 14, 2011 || Mount Lemmon || Mount Lemmon Survey ||  || align=right | 2.3 km || 
|-id=952 bgcolor=#d6d6d6
| 501952 ||  || — || June 23, 2010 || WISE || WISE ||  || align=right | 3.2 km || 
|-id=953 bgcolor=#E9E9E9
| 501953 ||  || — || November 20, 2014 || Mount Lemmon || Mount Lemmon Survey ||  || align=right data-sort-value="0.99" | 990 m || 
|-id=954 bgcolor=#E9E9E9
| 501954 ||  || — || November 4, 2005 || Mount Lemmon || Mount Lemmon Survey ||  || align=right | 1.9 km || 
|-id=955 bgcolor=#E9E9E9
| 501955 ||  || — || October 3, 2013 || Haleakala || Pan-STARRS ||  || align=right | 1.8 km || 
|-id=956 bgcolor=#FA8072
| 501956 ||  || — || December 13, 2004 || Anderson Mesa || LONEOS ||  || align=right | 1.0 km || 
|-id=957 bgcolor=#E9E9E9
| 501957 ||  || — || June 21, 2007 || Mount Lemmon || Mount Lemmon Survey ||  || align=right | 2.8 km || 
|-id=958 bgcolor=#E9E9E9
| 501958 ||  || — || January 17, 1998 || Caussols || ODAS ||  || align=right | 1.7 km || 
|-id=959 bgcolor=#fefefe
| 501959 ||  || — || February 10, 2008 || Mount Lemmon || Mount Lemmon Survey ||  || align=right data-sort-value="0.70" | 700 m || 
|-id=960 bgcolor=#fefefe
| 501960 ||  || — || February 20, 2009 || Kitt Peak || Spacewatch ||  || align=right data-sort-value="0.64" | 640 m || 
|-id=961 bgcolor=#fefefe
| 501961 ||  || — || November 19, 2006 || Kitt Peak || Spacewatch || MAS || align=right data-sort-value="0.93" | 930 m || 
|-id=962 bgcolor=#fefefe
| 501962 ||  || — || March 10, 2008 || Kitt Peak || Spacewatch || NYS || align=right data-sort-value="0.53" | 530 m || 
|-id=963 bgcolor=#E9E9E9
| 501963 ||  || — || September 15, 2009 || Catalina || CSS ||  || align=right | 1.4 km || 
|-id=964 bgcolor=#fefefe
| 501964 ||  || — || November 11, 2007 || Mount Lemmon || Mount Lemmon Survey ||  || align=right data-sort-value="0.66" | 660 m || 
|-id=965 bgcolor=#E9E9E9
| 501965 ||  || — || April 22, 2004 || Siding Spring || SSS ||  || align=right | 1.3 km || 
|-id=966 bgcolor=#E9E9E9
| 501966 ||  || — || January 20, 2012 || Haleakala || Pan-STARRS ||  || align=right | 1.3 km || 
|-id=967 bgcolor=#fefefe
| 501967 ||  || — || November 19, 2003 || Anderson Mesa || LONEOS ||  || align=right data-sort-value="0.77" | 770 m || 
|-id=968 bgcolor=#d6d6d6
| 501968 ||  || — || January 27, 2004 || Kitt Peak || Spacewatch || HYG || align=right | 2.6 km || 
|-id=969 bgcolor=#E9E9E9
| 501969 ||  || — || March 2, 2011 || Kitt Peak || Spacewatch ||  || align=right | 2.3 km || 
|-id=970 bgcolor=#d6d6d6
| 501970 ||  || — || November 7, 2008 || Mount Lemmon || Mount Lemmon Survey ||  || align=right | 2.5 km || 
|-id=971 bgcolor=#fefefe
| 501971 ||  || — || September 17, 2003 || Kitt Peak || Spacewatch ||  || align=right data-sort-value="0.82" | 820 m || 
|-id=972 bgcolor=#fefefe
| 501972 ||  || — || January 1, 2008 || Kitt Peak || Spacewatch ||  || align=right data-sort-value="0.72" | 720 m || 
|-id=973 bgcolor=#fefefe
| 501973 ||  || — || February 11, 2002 || Socorro || LINEAR ||  || align=right data-sort-value="0.82" | 820 m || 
|-id=974 bgcolor=#fefefe
| 501974 ||  || — || December 15, 2004 || Socorro || LINEAR ||  || align=right data-sort-value="0.81" | 810 m || 
|-id=975 bgcolor=#E9E9E9
| 501975 ||  || — || September 12, 2013 || Mount Lemmon || Mount Lemmon Survey || WIT || align=right | 2.3 km || 
|-id=976 bgcolor=#fefefe
| 501976 ||  || — || September 17, 2006 || Kitt Peak || Spacewatch ||  || align=right data-sort-value="0.89" | 890 m || 
|-id=977 bgcolor=#E9E9E9
| 501977 ||  || — || October 19, 2001 || Kitt Peak || Spacewatch ||  || align=right | 1.2 km || 
|-id=978 bgcolor=#d6d6d6
| 501978 ||  || — || March 2, 2011 || Mount Lemmon || Mount Lemmon Survey ||  || align=right | 2.9 km || 
|-id=979 bgcolor=#d6d6d6
| 501979 ||  || — || November 17, 2008 || Kitt Peak || Spacewatch || HYG || align=right | 2.8 km || 
|-id=980 bgcolor=#E9E9E9
| 501980 ||  || — || November 17, 2009 || Mount Lemmon || Mount Lemmon Survey ||  || align=right | 3.3 km || 
|-id=981 bgcolor=#fefefe
| 501981 ||  || — || November 20, 2006 || Kitt Peak || Spacewatch ||  || align=right data-sort-value="0.76" | 760 m || 
|-id=982 bgcolor=#fefefe
| 501982 ||  || — || December 18, 2003 || Socorro || LINEAR ||  || align=right data-sort-value="0.85" | 850 m || 
|-id=983 bgcolor=#E9E9E9
| 501983 ||  || — || October 8, 2005 || Kitt Peak || Spacewatch ||  || align=right | 1.1 km || 
|-id=984 bgcolor=#fefefe
| 501984 ||  || — || October 19, 2000 || Kitt Peak || Spacewatch ||  || align=right data-sort-value="0.62" | 620 m || 
|-id=985 bgcolor=#fefefe
| 501985 ||  || — || September 25, 2006 || Mount Lemmon || Mount Lemmon Survey ||  || align=right data-sort-value="0.77" | 770 m || 
|-id=986 bgcolor=#E9E9E9
| 501986 ||  || — || January 30, 2011 || Haleakala || Pan-STARRS ||  || align=right | 2.5 km || 
|-id=987 bgcolor=#E9E9E9
| 501987 ||  || — || December 21, 2006 || Catalina || CSS ||  || align=right | 1.3 km || 
|-id=988 bgcolor=#E9E9E9
| 501988 ||  || — || December 31, 2002 || Socorro || LINEAR ||  || align=right | 1.3 km || 
|-id=989 bgcolor=#E9E9E9
| 501989 ||  || — || May 5, 2003 || Kitt Peak || Spacewatch ||  || align=right | 1.2 km || 
|-id=990 bgcolor=#fefefe
| 501990 ||  || — || July 12, 2013 || Haleakala || Pan-STARRS ||  || align=right data-sort-value="0.69" | 690 m || 
|-id=991 bgcolor=#fefefe
| 501991 ||  || — || April 1, 2012 || Mount Lemmon || Mount Lemmon Survey ||  || align=right data-sort-value="0.61" | 610 m || 
|-id=992 bgcolor=#d6d6d6
| 501992 ||  || — || October 1, 2013 || Kitt Peak || Spacewatch ||  || align=right | 3.0 km || 
|-id=993 bgcolor=#E9E9E9
| 501993 ||  || — || December 8, 2010 || Mount Lemmon || Mount Lemmon Survey || EUN || align=right data-sort-value="0.85" | 850 m || 
|-id=994 bgcolor=#d6d6d6
| 501994 ||  || — || September 23, 2008 || Kitt Peak || Spacewatch || EOS || align=right | 2.6 km || 
|-id=995 bgcolor=#fefefe
| 501995 ||  || — || January 10, 2008 || Kitt Peak || Spacewatch ||  || align=right data-sort-value="0.73" | 730 m || 
|-id=996 bgcolor=#fefefe
| 501996 ||  || — || March 9, 2008 || Mount Lemmon || Mount Lemmon Survey ||  || align=right | 1.1 km || 
|-id=997 bgcolor=#d6d6d6
| 501997 ||  || — || May 14, 2010 || WISE || WISE || LIX || align=right | 2.3 km || 
|-id=998 bgcolor=#E9E9E9
| 501998 ||  || — || January 23, 2006 || Mount Lemmon || Mount Lemmon Survey || AGN || align=right | 1.7 km || 
|-id=999 bgcolor=#E9E9E9
| 501999 ||  || — || January 30, 2006 || Kitt Peak || Spacewatch ||  || align=right | 1.8 km || 
|-id=000 bgcolor=#fefefe
| 502000 ||  || — || November 14, 2001 || Kitt Peak || Spacewatch ||  || align=right data-sort-value="0.63" | 630 m || 
|}

References

External links 
 Discovery Circumstances: Numbered Minor Planets (500001)–(505000) (IAU Minor Planet Center)

0501